= List of microquasars =

This is a list of all known microquasars:

== 1 ==
- 1E 1740,7-2942

== 4 ==
- 4U1630-47

== C ==
- Cygnus X-1
- Cygnus X-3 (V1521)
- CI Cam

== G ==
- GRS 1915+105
- GRO J1655-40
- GX339-4

== K ==
- KS1731-260

== L ==
- LS I +61 303
- LS 5039

== S ==
- Scorpius X-1
- SS 433

== V ==
- V404 Cygni
- V4641 Sgr
- V691 CrA

== X ==
- XMMU J004243.6+412519
- XTE J1118+480
- XTE J1550-564

== See also ==
- List of quasars
