= OH 471 =

Quasar in the constellation Auriga

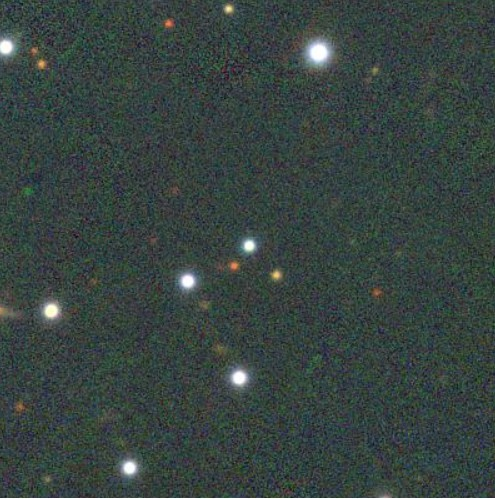
- The quasar/blazar OH 471.

Observation data (J2000.0 epoch)
- Constellation: Auriga
- Right ascension: 06^{h} 46^{m} 32.0260^{s}
- Declination: +44° 51′ 16.590″
- Redshift: 3.396000
- Heliocentric radial velocity: 1,018,295 km/s
- Distance: 11.442 Gly
- Apparent magnitude (V): 18.49
- Apparent magnitude (B): 19.57

Characteristics
- Type: Opt. var; LPQ, FSRQ

Other designations
- 2E 1729, QSO B0642+449, NVSS J064632+445116, KODIAQ JJ064632+445116, S4 0642+449

OH 471 (OHIO H 471) is a distant powerful quasar located in the northern constellation of Auriga. First discovered in 1974 from a photoelectric spectrophotometry, the object has a redshift of (z) 3.40. This high redshift makes it one of the most distant objects observed, giving it a nickname of "the blaze marking the edge of the universe." It is found to be significantly variable thus classifying it as a blazar.

== Description ==
OH 471 is a low polarized quasar but also a high frequency peaker (HFP). It is a radio-loud gamma ray blazar with a central supermassive black hole mass of 9.1 M_{☉} and a luminosity of 6.8 × 10^{28} W Hz^{−1}. In its spectrum, it shows an inverted and steep spectra, reaching a peak at 18.6 GHz.

In additional, OH 471 also displayed two major flares, visible at higher frequencies of 15 and 8 GHz, in March 2003 and October 2008. Reduced activity was observed in the object with its flux density decreasing following 2009. During 1985 to 1996, the object exhibited an increase in its radio flux with its factor showing a slight increase by 1.6.

Observations by Very Long Baseline Interferometry found the object has a core-jet morphology. Based on radio images, the source is compact. Its non-linear structure described as a jet, is found to be extended by 8 milliarcseconds to the east direction. The jet also appears as twisted with a bending angle of 50°. Superluminal motion was also implied as the inner jet component displayed an estimated core separation of 0.76 ± 0.11c. A nuclear region was detected, containing most of the flux density. There is a resolved radio core extending along a position angle of 81°, which is further broken up into two individual circular nuclear components with a separation of 0.76 mas. A fainter component can be seen west from the core.

Digicon and image-tube spectroscopy of the spectrum of OH 471, found there are 89 absorption lines. Four absorption-line redshift systems are identified. Based on results, they are located at redshifts (z) 3.122, 3.191, 3.246 and 3.343.
