= V404 Cygni =

Multiple system in the constellation Cygnus

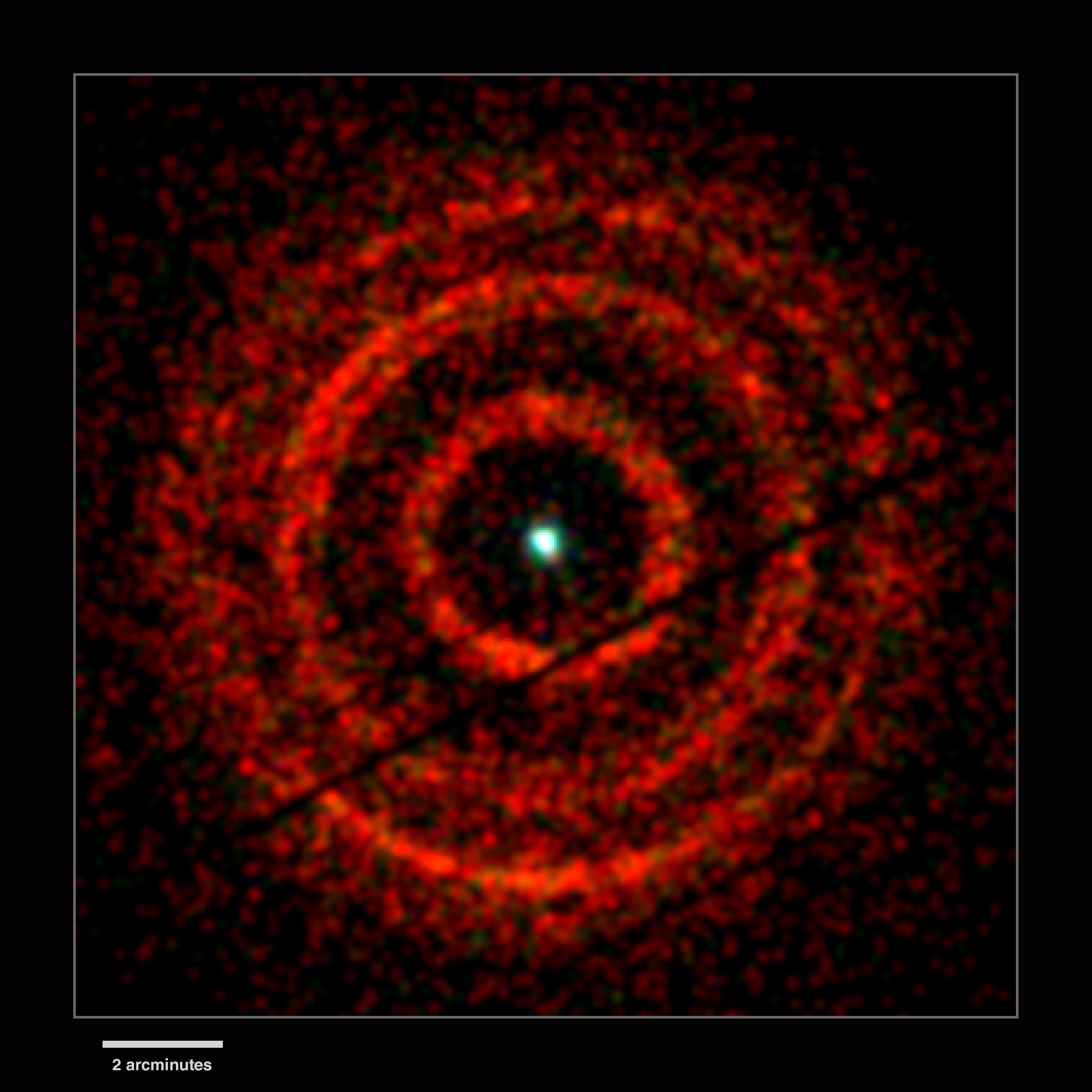
- X-ray light echoes from the 2015 nova eruption Credit: Andrew Beardmore (Univ. of Leicester) and NASA/Swift

Observation data Epoch J2000.0 Equinox ICRS
- Constellation: Cygnus
- Right ascension: 20^{h} 24^{m} 03.82^{s}
- Declination: +33° 52′ 02.0″
- Apparent magnitude (V): 11.2 - 18.8

Characteristics
- Spectral type: K3 III
- U−B color index: +0.3
- B−V color index: +1.5
- Variable type: Nova

Astrometry
Proper motion (μ)	RA: −5.177 mas/yr Dec.: −7.778 mas/yr
Parallax (π)	0.3024±0.0783 mas
Distance	2,390 pc
Absolute magnitude (M_{V})	+3.4

Details

A (black hole)
Mass	9 M_{☉}

B
Mass	0.7 M_{☉}
Radius	6.0 R_{☉}
Luminosity	10.2 L_{☉}
Surface gravity (log g)	3.50 cgs
Temperature	4,800 K
Metallicity [Fe/H]	+0.23 dex
Rotational velocity (v sin i)	36.4 km/s

C
Mass	1.2 M_{☉}
Radius	1.85 R_{☉}
Surface gravity (log g)	3.95 cgs
Temperature	6,123 K
Metallicity [Fe/H]	−0.09 dex
Age	4 Gyr

Other designations
- V404 Cyg, Nova Cygni 1938, Nova Cygni 1989, GS 2023+338, AAVSO 2020+33

Database references
SIMBAD	data

V404 Cygni is a microquasar and a triple star system in the constellation of Cygnus. It contains a black hole with a mass of about 9 M_{☉} and an early K giant star companion with a mass slightly smaller than the Sun, and an evolved tertiary component. The inner star and the black hole orbit each other every 6.47129 days at fairly close range, while the outer tertiary takes 70000 years to orbit the inner binary system. Due to their proximity and the intense gravity of the black hole, the secondary star loses mass to an accretion disk around the black hole and ultimately to the black hole itself.

The "V" in the name indicates that it is a variable star, which repeatedly gets brighter and fainter over time. It is also considered a nova, because at least three times in the 20th century it produced a bright outburst of energy. Finally, it is a soft X-ray transient because it periodically emits short bursts of X-rays.

The black hole companion has been proposed as a Q star candidate.

== Observation history ==
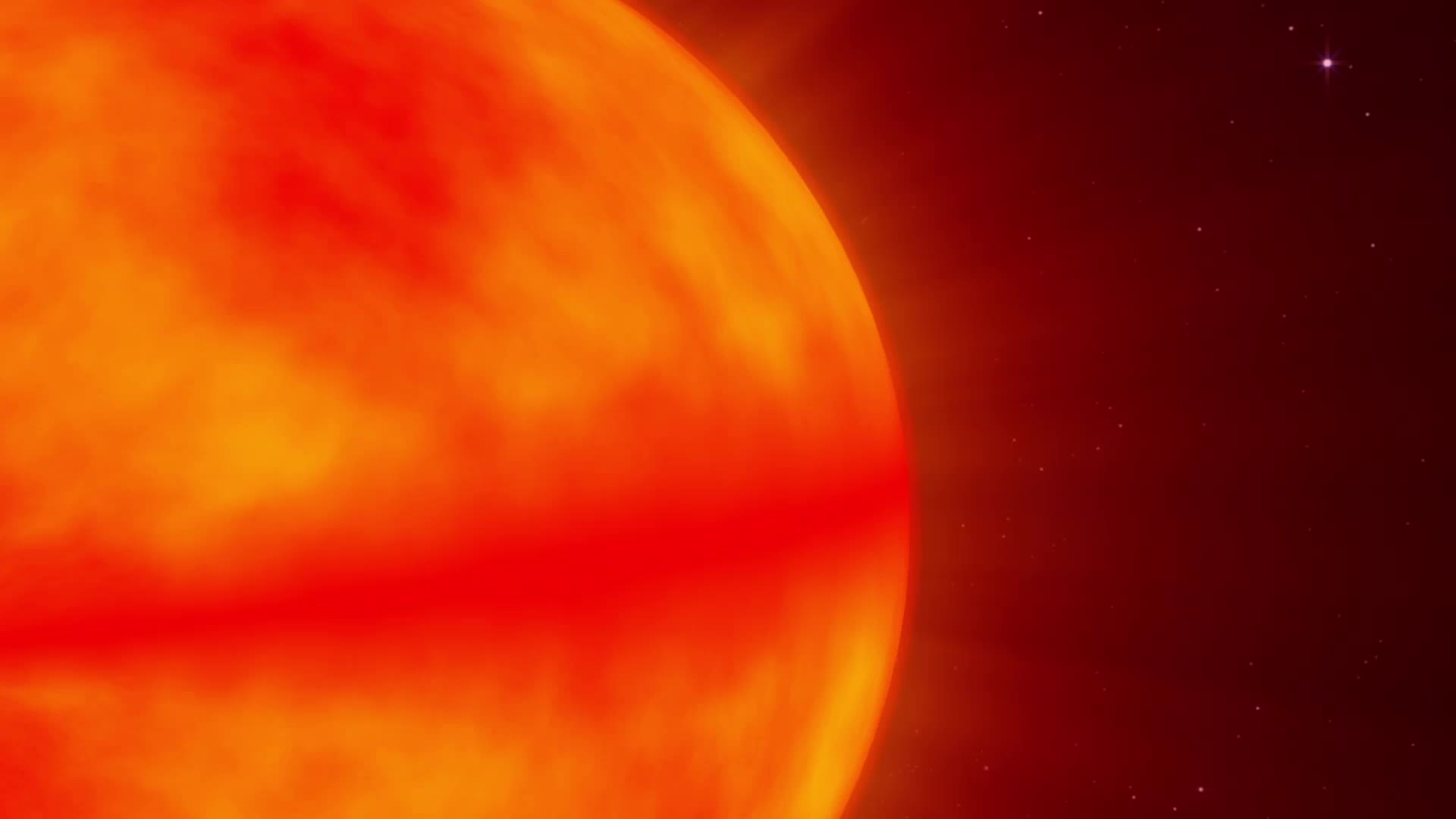
Rare X-ray outburst from a stellar-mass black hole in the binary system V404 Cygni. Video on YouTube

The system was first noted as Nova Cygni 1938 and given the variable star designation V404 Cygni. It was considered to be an ordinary "moderately fast" nova although large fluctuations were noted during the decline. It was discovered after maximum light, and the photographic magnitude range was measured at 12.5–20.5.

On May 22, 1989, the Japanese Ginga Team discovered a new X-ray source that was catalogued as GS 2023+338. This source was quickly linked to V404 Cygni, which was discovered to be in outburst again as Nova Cygni 1989.

Follow-up studies showed a previously unnoticed outburst in 1956. There was also a possible brightening in 1979.

In 2009, the black hole in the V404 Cygni system became the first black hole to have an accurate parallax measurement for its distance from the Solar System. Measured by very-long-baseline interferometry using the High Sensitivity Array, the distance is 2.39±0.14 kiloparsecs, or 7800±460 light-years.

In April 2019, astronomers announced that jets of particles shooting from the black hole were wobbling back and forth on the order of a few minutes, something that had never before been seen in the particle jets streaming from a black hole. Astronomers believe that the wobble is caused by the Lense-Thirring effect due to warping of space/time by the huge gravitational field in the vicinity of the black hole.

In April 2024, astronomers announced that V404 Cygni was discovered to be part of a hierarchical triple star system, with the tertiary companion being at least 3500 AU away from the inner binary system. This discovery was evidence that V404 Cygni formed with a minimal black hole natal kick on the order of less than 5 km/s. The tertiary component was also found to be evolved, indicating that the triple system has remained bounded through the black hole's formation and that the system's age is constrained to between 3-5 billion years old.

== 2015 outburst ==
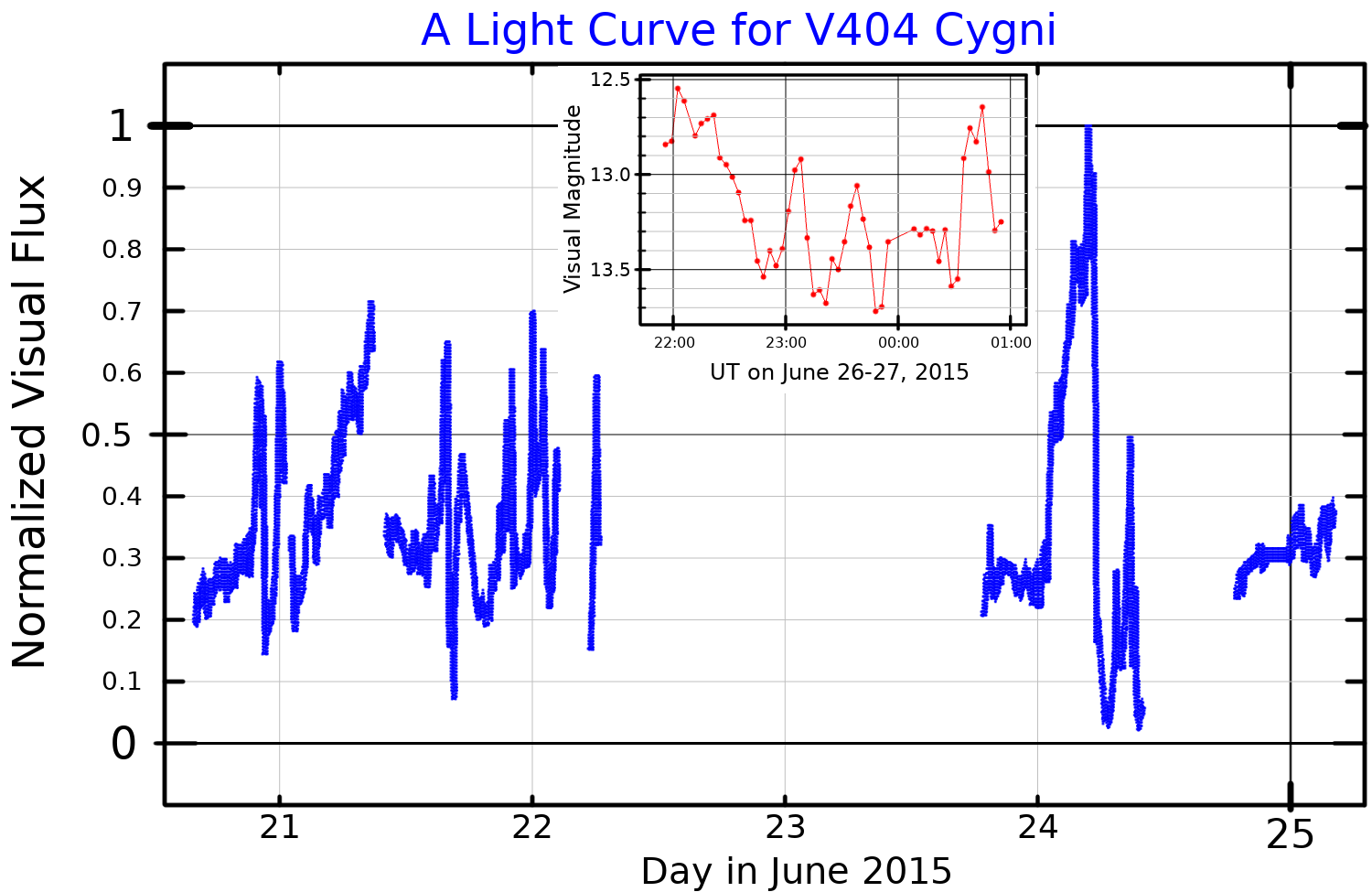
A visual band light curve for V404 Cygni. The main plot shows the large variations during the 2015 outburst, and the inset shows the short timescale variations. Adapted from Rodriguez et al. (2015) and Martí et al. (2016)

On 15 June 2015 NASA's Swift satellite detected the first signs of renewed activity. A worldwide observing campaign was commenced and on 17 June ESA's INTEGRAL Gamma-ray observatory started monitoring the outburst. INTEGRAL was detecting "repeated bright flashes of light time scales shorter than an hour, something rarely seen in other black hole systems", and during these flashes V404 Cygni was the brightest object in the X-ray sky—up to fifty times brighter than the Crab Nebula. This outburst was the first since 1989.

Other outbursts occurred in 1938 and 1956, and the outbursts were probably caused by material piling up in a disk around the black hole until a tipping point was reached. The outburst was unusual in that physical processes in the inner accretion disk were detectable in optical photometry from small telescopes; previously, these variations were thought to be only detectable with space-based X-ray telescopes. A detailed analysis of the INTEGRAL data revealed the existence of so-called pair plasma near the black hole. This plasma consists of electrons and their antimatter counterparts, positrons.

A follow-up study of the 2015 data found a coronal magnetic field strength of 461±12 gauss, "substantially lower than previous estimates for such systems".

== See also ==
- List of stars in Cygnus
- List of black holes
  - List of nearest black holes
