= Disk wind =

Particle outflow from an accretion disk

In astronomy, a disk wind is a particle outflow observed around accretion disks, mainly near protoplanetary disks and active galactic nuclei (AGN). The disk wind is made up of a gaseous and a dusty component. Especially in edge-on protoplanetary disks this disk wind can be directly imaged.

== Young stellar objects ==
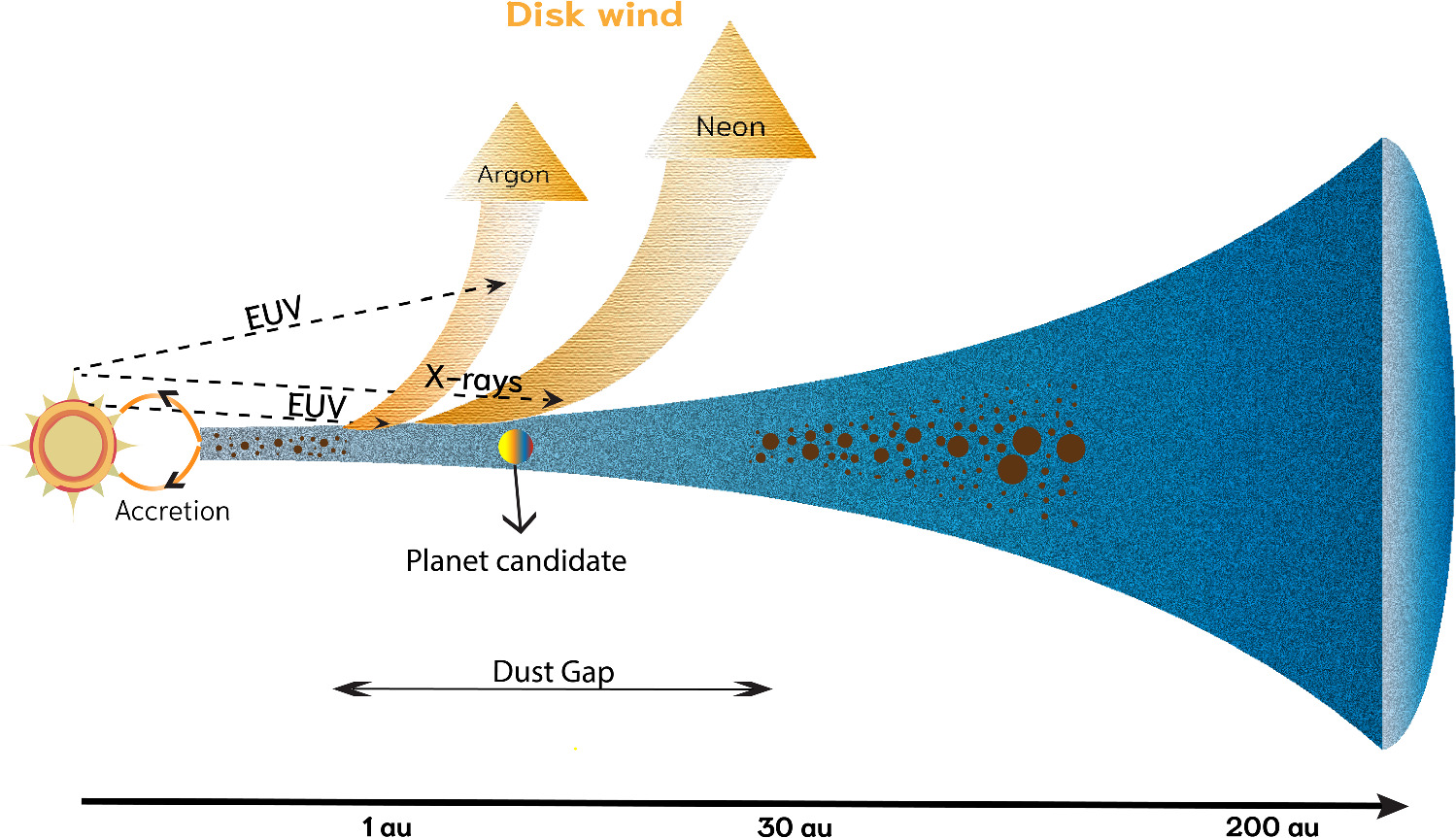
Sketch (side-view) of the disk, protostar, protoplanet and disk wind around T Chamaeleontis, which was resolved with the James Webb Space Telescope by Bajaj et al.

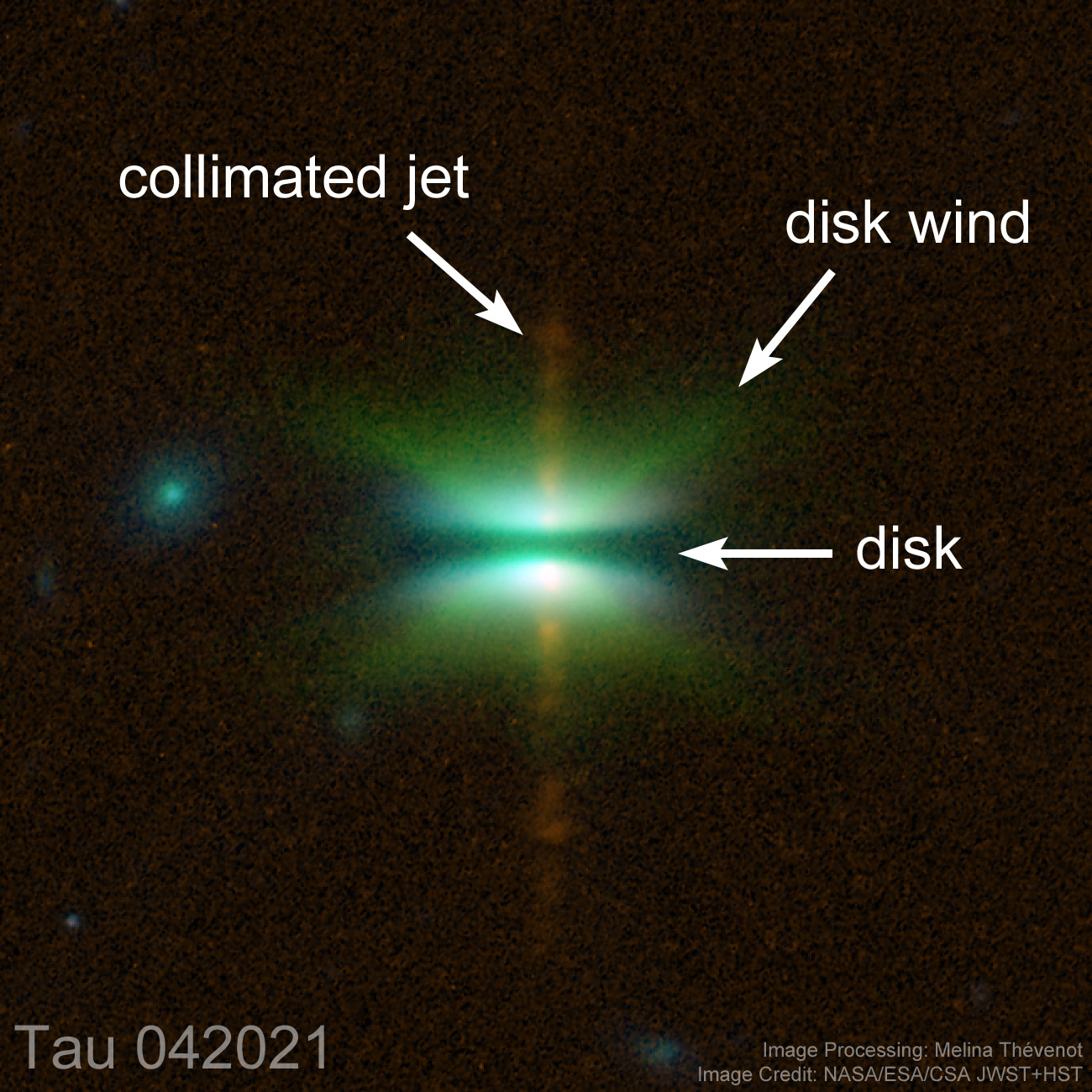
Tau 042021 with its components in different colors. The collimated jets are red, the disk wind is green and the disk is blue and the dark aborption band. The disk wind was discovered in two papers.

The disk wind often appears as a nested structure, with high-velocity narrow collimated jets surrounded by a slower and wider disk wind. This wider disk wind is often detected in molecular emission lines. The central star or protostar or the accretion process is emitting high-energy photons, from far-ultraviolet to x-rays. This ionizes and heats the gas and dust in the disk. This material is first ejected due to magnetorotational instability (MRI). Material is flung out by magneto-centrifugal processes and this model describes the wind as magnetohydrodynamic winds (MHD winds). One important function of the MHD wind is that it transports angular momentum away from the disk and the protostar. If the MHD wind fails to escape the star, it might fall onto the equator region of the star and contribute to accretion of material. Studies have shown that disk wind is the major contributor to accretion in young stellar objects. In the late stage, disk winds are seen as a way of dispersing of a protoplanetary disks. These models describe the winds as photoevaporative winds (PE winds), which are thermally driven and play no role in removal of angular momentum. In this model, the disk surface is heated by photons and evaporates in a wind. Most wide-angle slow disk winds are however consistent with MHD winds and have a larger mass loss rate than the narrow jets. As the system evolves into class II objects, the jet becomes less visible and the MHD winds transition into PE winds. At the same time the accretion of material onto the star declines.

The disk wind also influences the solid component of the protoplanetary disk and therefore planet formation in this region. The disk wind mainly removes gas from the disk, but dust particles are also swept away from the disk. This increases the dust-to-gas ratio and promotes the formation of solid particles and subsequently the formation of planetesimals. In a typical protoplanetary disk the low mass planets migrate inwards due to gravitational interactions with the disk. The reduced density of the inner disk can slow down, prevent or reverse planet migration in this region.

Especially Atacama Large Millimeter Array observations helped to resolve these disk winds in the past. But the James Webb Space Telescope has already contributed to the discovery of multiple resolved molecular disk winds. In more face-on disks, like HD 163296, the disk wind can be detected via infrared excess and by clumps transiting in front of the star.

== Active galactic nuclei ==
Outflows around supermassive black holes (SMBH) can be classified as either fast and collimated jets, or as slow (≤20% speed of light), but more massive disk winds. These disk winds are most notably seen in broad absorption lines of some AGN, called broad absorption line quasar (BALQSOs). Several mechanisms have been proposed as drivers of these disk winds. One idea is the "line-driven" disk wind. In this scenario UV photons, which are produced in the disk near the SMBH, are scattered by strong resonance lines. Many such lines are observed in the UV spectra of BALQSOs. This disk wind is expanding in the plane of the disk.

== Around other objects ==
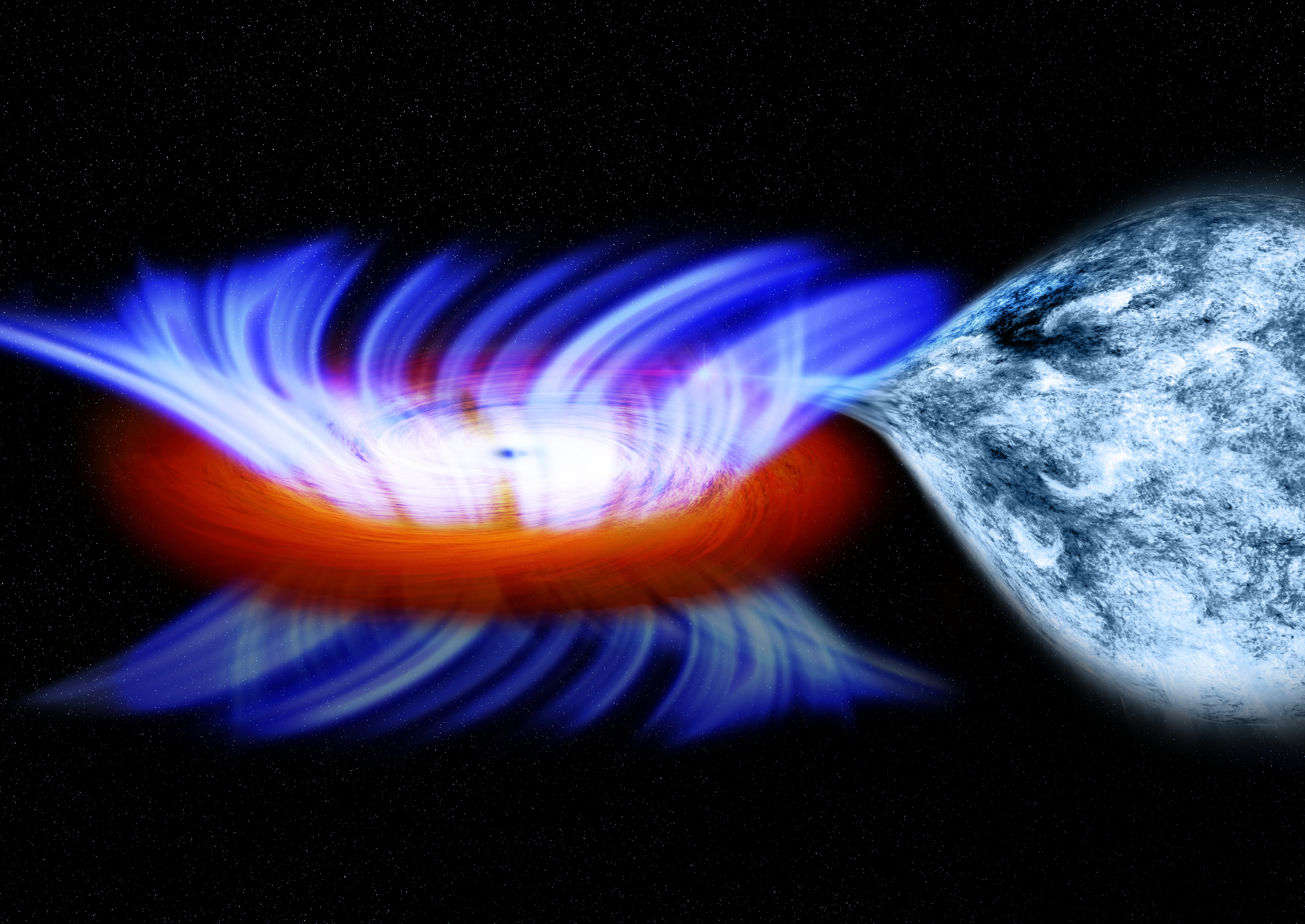
Artist's impression of the disk wind around the stellar mass black hole IGR J17091-3624

Disk winds were found around other objects, such as the stellar mass black hole GRO J1655-40, disk winds in black hole x-ray binaries, or disk winds are suspected to occur in kilonovae.

== See also ==
- Circumstellar disk
- Stellar wind
