= GS 2000+25 =

Star in the constellation Vulpecula

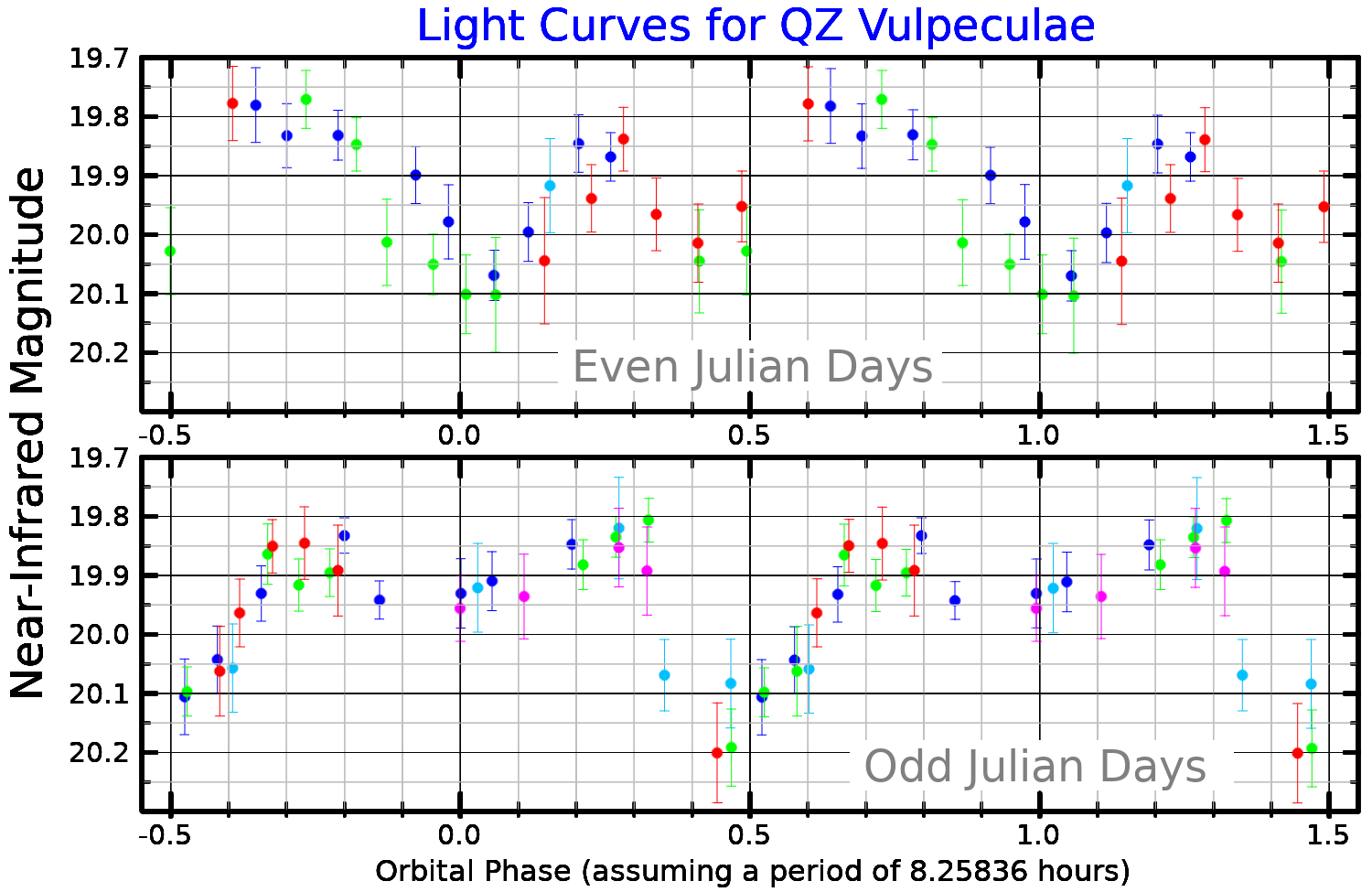
- Near-infrared (I band) light curves for QZ Vulpeculae, adapted from Chevalier and Ilovaisky (1993). The data were collected over a 10 night period in July 1991. Data collected on different nights are plotted with different colors. The shape of the light curve changed over a period of approximately two days, leading to different shapes on even or odd numbered days.

Observation data Epoch J2000 Equinox ICRS
- Constellation: Vulpecula
- Right ascension: 20^{h} 02^{m} 49.58^{s}
- Declination: +25° 14′ 11.3″
- Apparent magnitude (V): 18.2

Characteristics
- Spectral type: Black hole + K3-6 V

Astrometry
Distance	8800 ± 2300 ly (2700 ± 700 pc)

Orbit
Period (P)	8.26 hr

Details

Black hole
Mass	7.2–7.8 M_{☉}

Other designations
- Nova Vul 1988, INTREF 1007, QZ Vul

Database references
SIMBAD	data

GS 2000+25 is an X-ray binary system in the constellation Vulpecula, consisting of a late K-type star and a black hole. It is also an X-ray nova.

Fumiyoshi Makino and the Ginga satellite team discovered GS 2000+25, in April 1988. A few days later a star, variable in visible light, was identified at its position. It received its variable star designation, QZ Vulpeculae, in 1989.

== Properties ==
Because the black hole is more massive than the companion star, it is the primary of the system. The black hole has a mass of about 5 solar masses while the companion has a mass of about 0.5 solar masses. Because the companion star has a low mass, the system is a low-mass X-ray binary.

== See also ==
- List of nearest black holes
