= IGR J17091-3624 =

Black hole in the constellation Scorpius

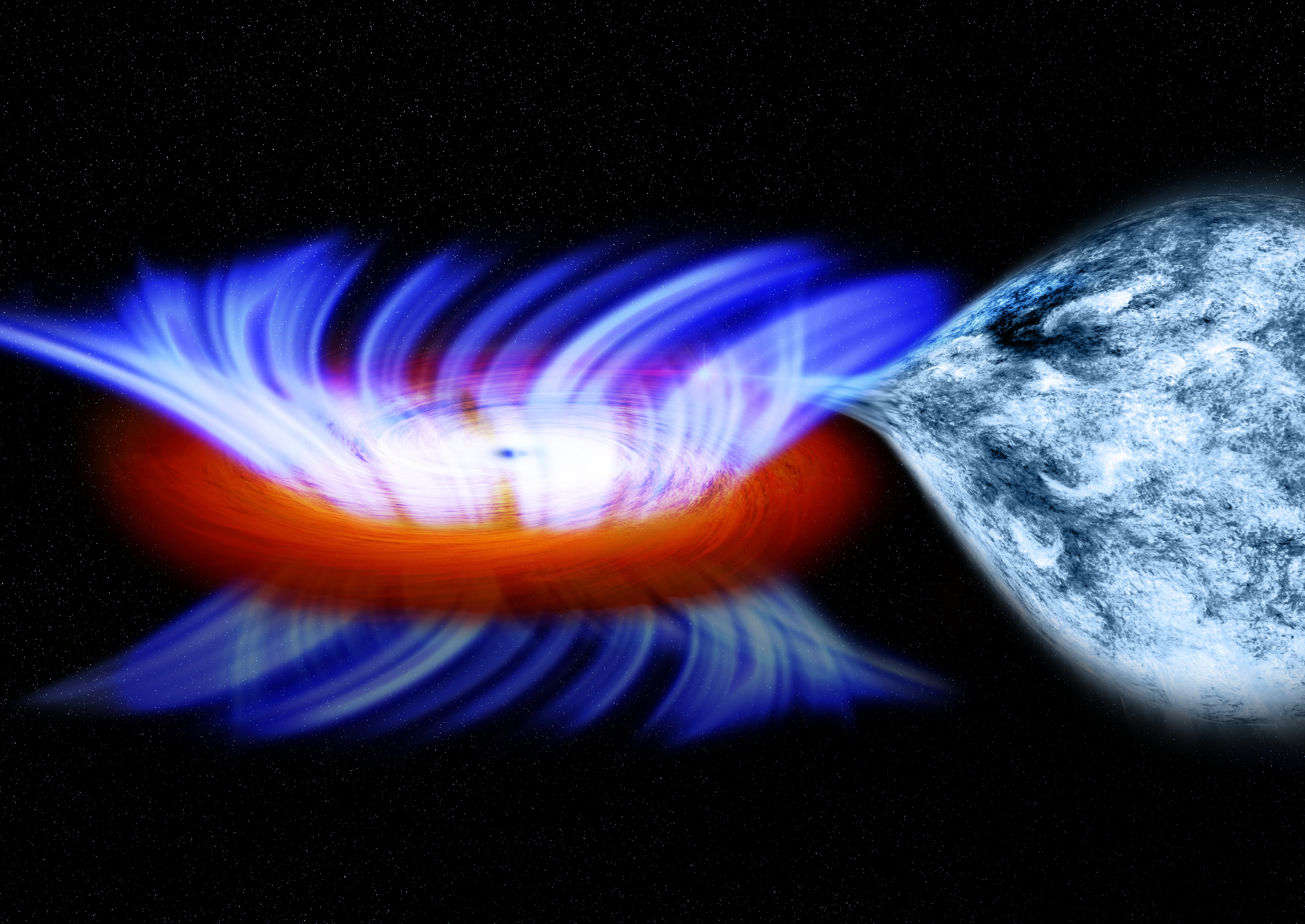
- Artist's impression of the binary system of IGR J17091-3624

Observation data Epoch J2000 Equinox J2000
- Constellation: Scorpius
- Right ascension: 17^{h} 09^{m} 08.0^{s}
- Declination: −36° 24′ 24″

Other designations
- SWIFT J1709.8-3627B, INTEGRAL1 44, CXOU J170907.6-362425

Database references
SIMBAD	data

IGR J17091-3624 (also IGR J17091) is a stellar mass black hole 28,000 light-years away. It lies in the constellation Scorpius in the Milky Way galaxy.

== Discovery ==
IGR J17091 was discovered by ESA's INTEGRAL satellite in April 2003.

== Description ==
IGR J17091 is a stellar mass black hole with a mass between 3 and 10 M_{☉}. It is a binary system in which a star orbits the black hole. Its small size may make it a candidate for the smallest black hole discovered. However, as of 2017 its mass was described as "unknown".

Observations by the Chandra X-ray Observatory in 2011 discovered that it produces the fastest winds ever coming from an accretion disk at 3,218,688 km/h (2 million mph) making it about 0.3% of the speed of light. This is 10 times faster than the next-highest-measured wind speed. According to Ashley King from the University of Michigan "Contrary to the popular perception of black holes pulling in all of the material that gets close, we estimate up to 95 percent of the matter in the disk around IGR J17091 is expelled by the wind."

IGR J17091 also exhibits peculiar X-ray variability patterns or "heartbeats" which are small, quasi-periodic, outbursts repeated over a 5- to 70-second timescale. Similar variability has only been observed in the black hole GRS 1915+105; however, IGR J17091's outbursts are 20 times fainter.

== See also ==
- List of black holes
- Micro black hole
- Hawking radiation
