= 4U 1543−475 =

High-mass X-ray binary

IL Lupi
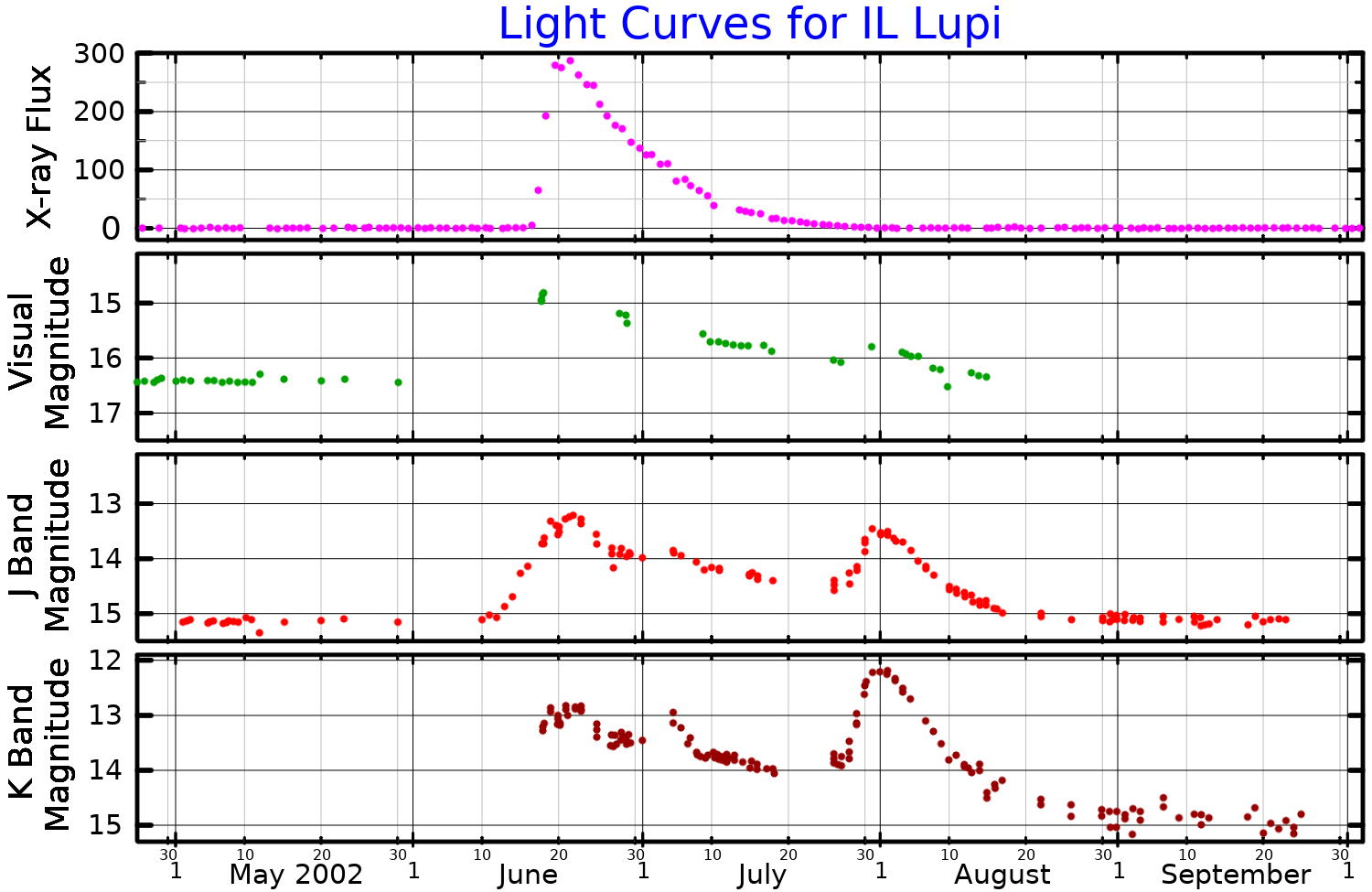
- Light curves for the 2002 outburst of IL Lupi, adapted from Buxton & Bailyn (2004). The top panel shows the X-ray flux, while the lower three panels show the magnitude change in the visible, and two near-infrared bands.

Observation data Epoch J2000.0 Equinox ICRS
- Constellation: Lupus
- Right ascension: 15^{h} 47^{m} 08.27687^{s}
- Declination: −47° 40′ 10.2846″
- Apparent magnitude (V): 11.96 (14.6 - 16.7)

Characteristics
- Evolutionary stage: main sequence
- Spectral type: A2 V + black hole
- Variable type: XNG

Astrometry
Proper motion (μ)	RA: −7.543 mas/yr Dec.: −5.356 mas/yr
Parallax (π)	0.1909±0.0551 mas
Distance	approx. 17,000 ly (approx. 5,000 pc)

Details

donor star
Mass	2.45±0.15 M_{☉}
Radius	2.84±0.11 R_{☉}
Luminosity	48±11 L_{☉}
Surface gravity (log g)	3.82 cgs
Temperature	9,000±500 K
Metallicity [Fe/H]	−0.11 dex

black hole
Mass	9.4±2.0 M_{☉}

Other designations
- 4U 1543−47, IL Lup, TIC 254732447, 2MASS J15470829−4740103

Database references
SIMBAD	data

4U 1543−475 is a recurrent X-ray transient located in the southern constellation Lupus, the wolf. IL Lupi is its variable star designation. It has an apparent magnitude that fluctuates between 14.6 and 16.7, making it readily visible in large telescopes but not to the naked eye. The object is located relatively far at a distance of approximately 17,000 light years based on Gaia DR3 parallax measurements.

4U 1543−475 was first observed by Uhuru in 1971. In 1976, 4U 1543−475's spectrum was observed. However, its status as a black hole binary had not been confirmed until 1984 by astronomer S. Kiamoto and colleagues. After subsequent observations, it was given the variable star designation IL Lupi in 1995. 4U 1543−475 has erupted at least four times.

== See also ==
- List of black holes
- List of nearest black holes
