= XTE J1118+480 =

Star system in the constellation Ursa Major

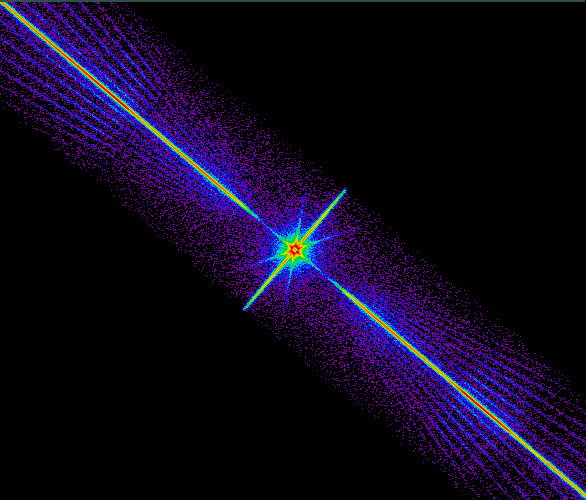
- The spectrum of the black hole in the XTE J1118+480 system

Observation data Epoch J2000 Equinox ICRS
- Constellation: Ursa Major
- Right ascension: 11^{h} 18^{m} 10.80^{s}
- Declination: 48° 02′ 12.3″
- Apparent magnitude (V): 12.25

Orbit
Primary	Black hole
Name	B
Period (P)	<0.5 d
Eccentricity (e)	0.022±0.003
Inclination (i)	74±4°

Details

Black hole
Mass	7.24^{+0.9}_{−0.7} M_{☉}

B
Mass	0.2±0.02 M_{☉}

Other designations
- KV Ursae Majoris, 2MASS J11181079+4802126, AAVSO 1112+48

Database references
SIMBAD	data

XTE J1118+480 is a low-mass X-ray binary in the constellation Ursa Major. It is a soft X-ray transient that most likely contains a black hole and is probably a microquasar.

== Discovery ==
XTE J1118+480 was discovered using the All-Sky Monitor on the Rossi X-Ray Timing Explorer satellite after it detected an outburst from the system on March 29, 2000. XTE is the standard designation for objects discovered by this satellite. It is also catalogued as 2MASS J11181079+4802126 in the Two-Micron All Sky Survey catalogue of infrared objects, and has been given the variable star designation KV Ursae Majoris.

== April–June outburst ==
Much of what is known about XTE J1118+480 comes from data collected during the outburst in March 2000. The Rossi X-Ray Timing Explorer and the Advanced Research and Global Observation Satellite observed a quasi-periodic oscillation (QPO) from XTE J1118+480 as it evolved. The QPO is comparable to QPOs of other black-hole candidates.

== Properties ==
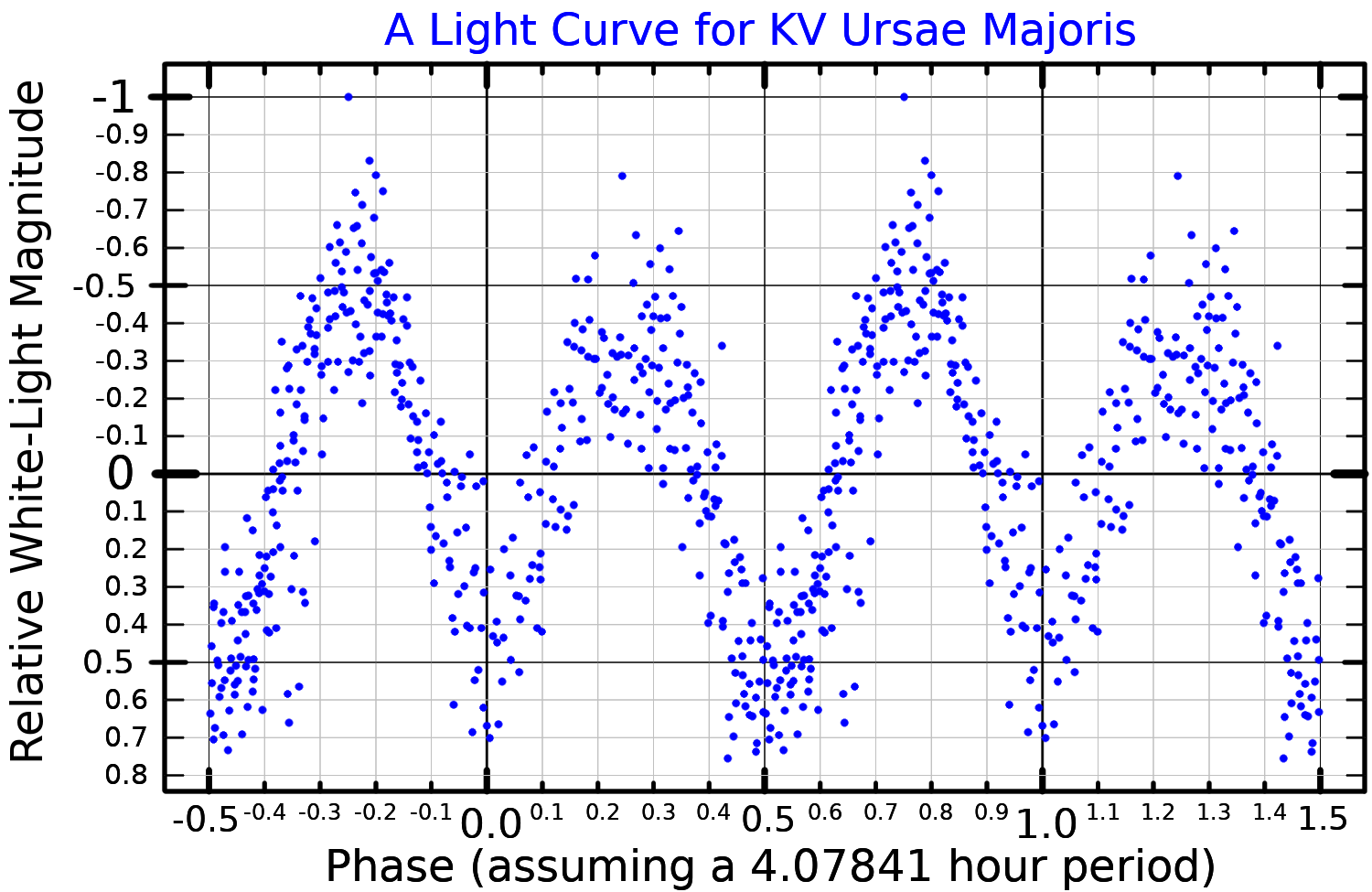
A white-light light curve for KV Ursae Majoris, adapted from Cherepashchuk et al. (2019)

The compact object in XTE J1118+480 has a mass greater than 6 M_{☉}, so it is too massive to be a neutron star. The characteristics of radio emissions from XTE J1118+480 (Fender et al. 2001) suggest that it is a microquasar.

Strangely, the companion star has a metal-rich composition of various metals such as magnesium, aluminium, calcium, iron, and nickel. Because of this observation, the black hole most likely was not formed from direct collapse of a massive star, but rather from the supernova of a metal-rich star. The two objects in the binary system were probably not born together as a supernova would likely eject the companion from the system.

The most likely theory as to how the black hole became part of the binary system is that XTE J1118+480 was formed in the central galactic halo. The black hole primary was the result of a "kick" from the supernova explosion of a massive star in the early galaxy and travelled through the galaxy and into the central galactic halo, becoming a binary system with its present-day companion. If this theory is true, it may help to explain the supernova mechanism. The black hole in XTE J1118+480 is one of the few known examples of a black hole kick.

== See also ==
- List of nearest black holes
