= V4641 Sagittarii =

Binary star in the constellation Sagittarius

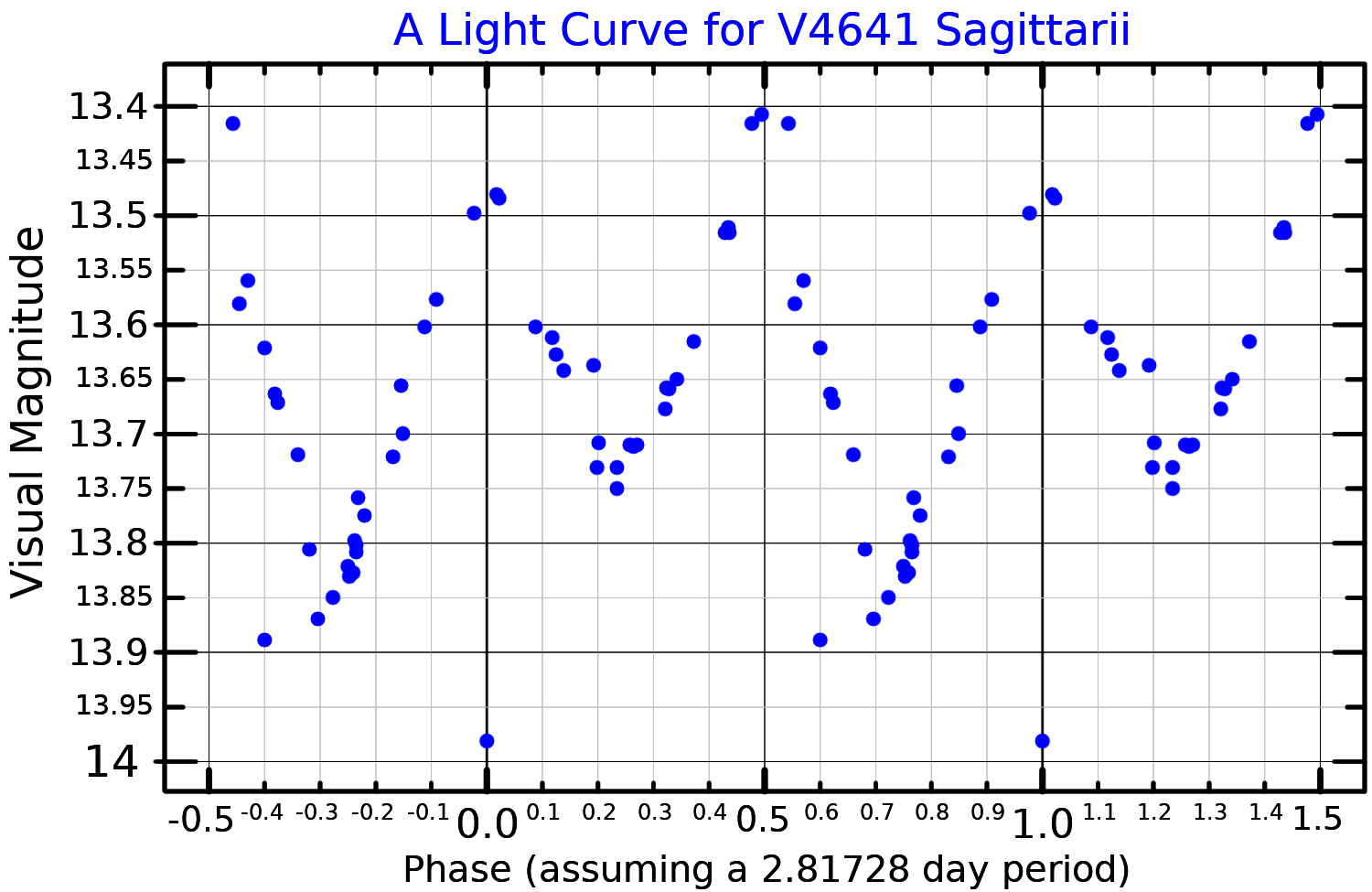
- A visual band light curve for V4641 Sagittarii, adapted from Goranskij (2001)

Observation data Epoch J2000.0 Equinox ICRS
- Constellation: Sagittarius
- Right ascension: 18^{h} 19^{m} 21.63427^{s}
- Declination: −25° 24′ 25.8493″
- Apparent magnitude (V): 9.0 - 14.0

Characteristics
- Spectral type: B9III
- Variable type: HMXB/BHXB/XN+ELL+E

Astrometry
Proper motion (μ)	RA: −0.734 mas/yr Dec.: +0.418 mas/yr
Parallax (π)	0.1510±0.0413 mas
Distance	20,200 ± 2,300 ly

Orbit
Period (P)	2.81730 d
Semi-major axis (a)	17.5±1.0 R_{☉}
Inclination (i)	72.3±4.1°
Periastron epoch (T)	2,452,423.647
Semi-amplitude (K_{2}) (secondary)	211.3±1.0 km/s

Details

Black hole
Mass	6.4±0.6 M_{☉}

Stellar companion
Mass	2.9±0.4 M_{☉}
Radius	5.3±0.3 R_{☉}
Surface gravity (log g)	3.5±0.1 cgs
Temperature	10,250±300 K
Rotational velocity (v sin i)	100.9±0.8 km/s

Other designations
- V4641 Sgr, AAVSO 1813-25B, GSC 06848-03786, 2MASS J18192163-2524258

Database references
SIMBAD	data

V4641 Sagittarii is a variable X-ray binary star system in the constellation Sagittarius. It is the source of one of the fastest superluminal jets in the Milky Way galaxy.

In 1978, Vitaly Petrovich Goranskij announced the detection of an outburst from this star. It was erroneously identified as a previously known mira variable, GM Sagittarii. Several additional outbursts of the star over the next few years were also attributed to GM Sagittarii. In 1999, it was noticed that the flaring star was about 72 arcseconds north of GM Sagittarii, and the flaring star was given its own variable star designation, V4641 Sagittarii.

In 1999 a violent X-ray outburst revealed it to contain a black hole. At the time, it was considered to be the closest known black hole to Earth, at a distance of approximately 1,600 light-years (490 pc). Later observations showed it to be much farther away, reported in 2001 to be between 7.4 and 12.31 kpc, 6.2 kpc in 2014, and around 6.6 kpc according to its Gaia Data Release 2 parallax.

The star in the binary system is a late B class giant with a mass about three times that of the Sun. It orbits a black hole about twice as massive every 2.8 days. The star is distorted, which causes variations in its brightness as it orbits and rotates. It is also slightly eclipsed by an accretion disc around the black hole. The system usually does not produce a significant amount of x-rays, but undergoes outbursts when the x-ray luminosity increases due to accretion onto the black hole driving superluminal jets.

V4641 Sgr is a source of ultra-high-energy gamma rays.
