= NGC 4459 =

Galaxy in the constellation Coma Berenicies

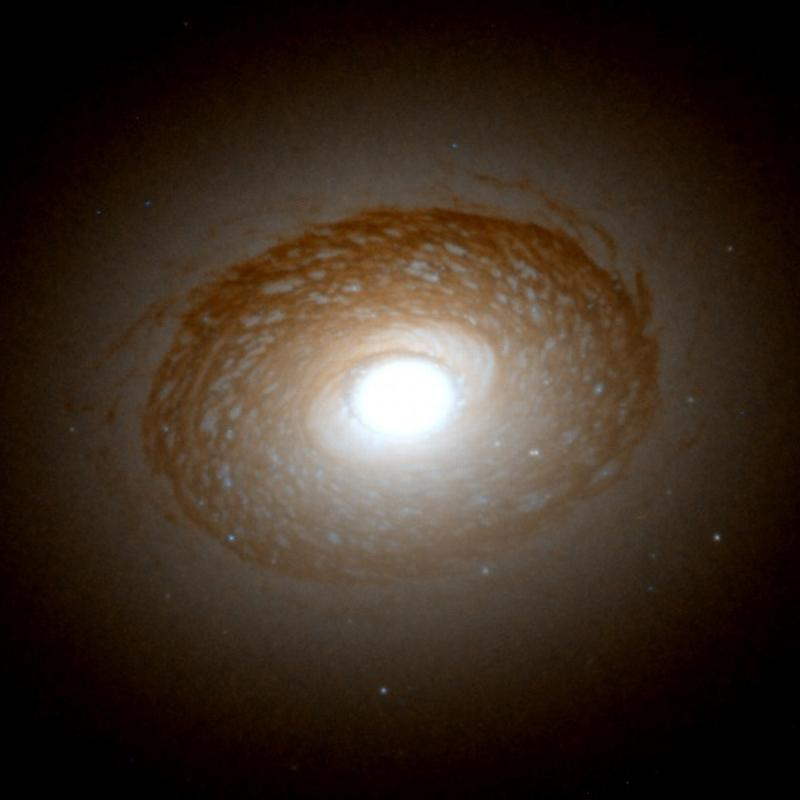
- The central dust lane of NGC 4459 as imaged by the Hubble Space Telescope

Observation data (J2000 epoch)
- Constellation: Coma Berenices
- Right ascension: 12^{h} 29^{m} 00.0^{s}
- Declination: 13° 58′ 42″
- Redshift: 0.003976
- Heliocentric radial velocity: 1,192 km/s
- Distance: 52.5 Mly (16.1 Mpc)
- Group or cluster: Virgo Cluster
- Apparent magnitude (V): 10.4

Characteristics
- Type: SA0^+(r), LINER
- Size: ~ 54,770 ly
- Apparent size (V): 3.5′ × 2.7′

Other designations
- IRAS 12264+1415, UGC 7614, MCG 2-32-83, PGC 41104, CGCG 70-116

NGC 4459 is a lenticular galaxy located about 50 million light-years away in the constellation of Coma Berenices. NGC 4459 is also classified as a LINER galaxy. NGC 4459 was discovered by astronomer William Herschel on January 14, 1787. NGC 4459 is a member of the Virgo Cluster.

== Physical characteristics ==
=== Dust disk ===
NGC 4459 has a central flocculent dust disk that surrounds an inner ring. Also, there appears to be evidence of ongoing star formation in the disk .

=== Super massive black hole ===
NGC 4459 has a supermassive black hole with an estimated mass of roughly 70 million suns (7×10^{7} M☉). Its diameter is estimated to be around 2.87 astronomical units (266.4 million mi).

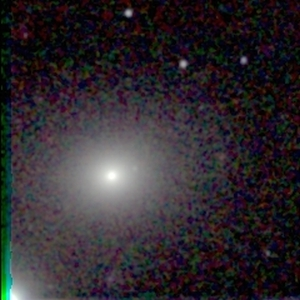
2MASS image of NGC 4459

== See also ==
- List of NGC objects (4001–5000)
- Messier 64
