= XTE J1550−564 =

Star in the constellation Norma

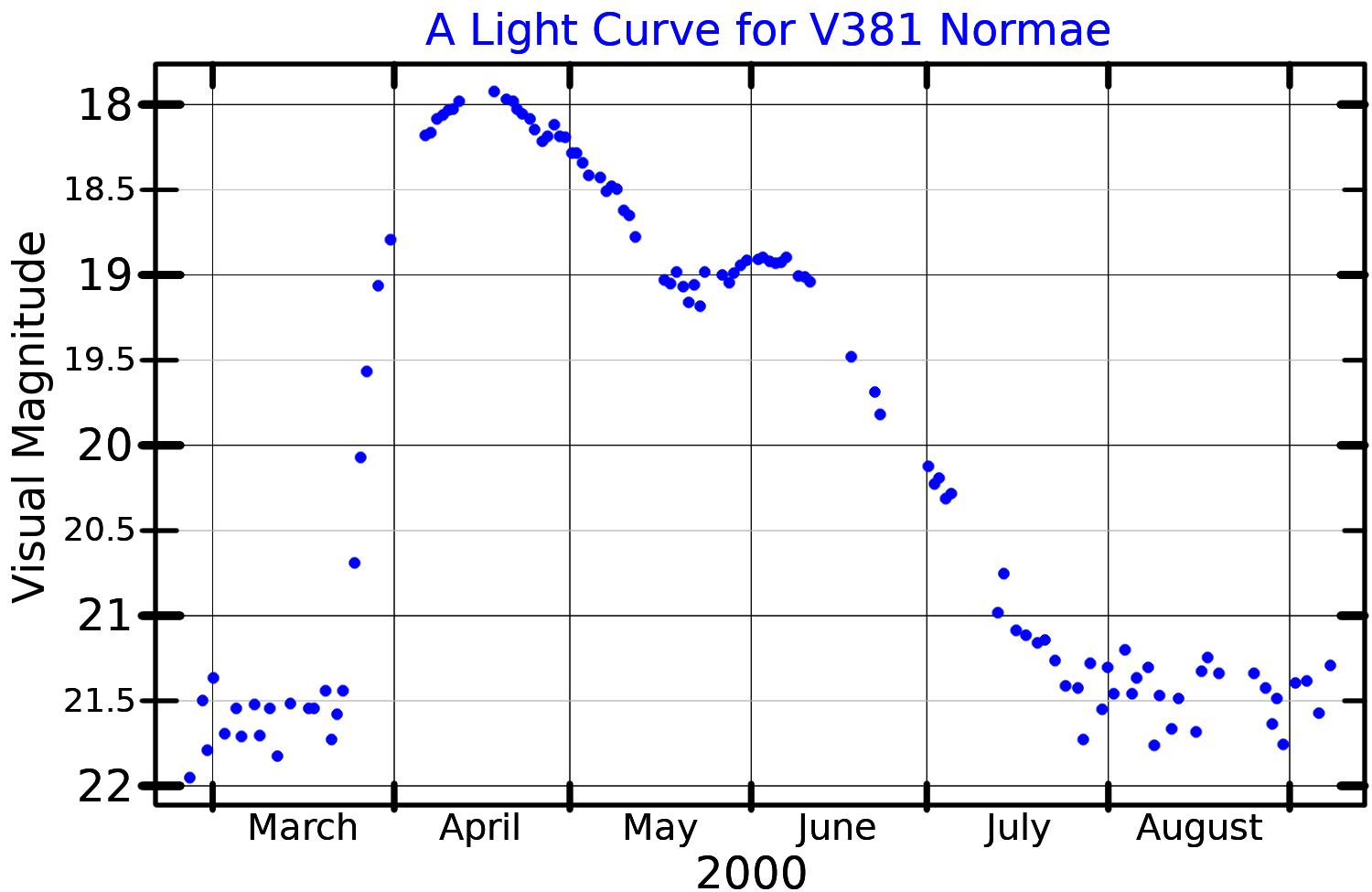
- The visual band light curve of a flare on V381 Normae, adapted from Poutanen et al. (2014)

Observation data Epoch J2000 Equinox ICRS
- Constellation: Norma
- Right ascension: 15^{h} 50^{m} 58.78^{s}
- Declination: −56° 28′ 35.0″
- Apparent magnitude (V): 16.6

Other designations
- V381 Normae

Database references
SIMBAD	data

XTE J1550−564, sometimes abbreviated to J1550 and also known as V381 Normae, is a low-mass X-ray binary in the constellation Norma. It is composed of a black hole around 10 times as massive as the Sun, and a star of spectral type K3III. The black hole fires out jets of matter that are thought to arise from an accretion disk, and is hence known as a microquasar.
