= 1ES 2344+514 =

Blazar in Cassiopeia

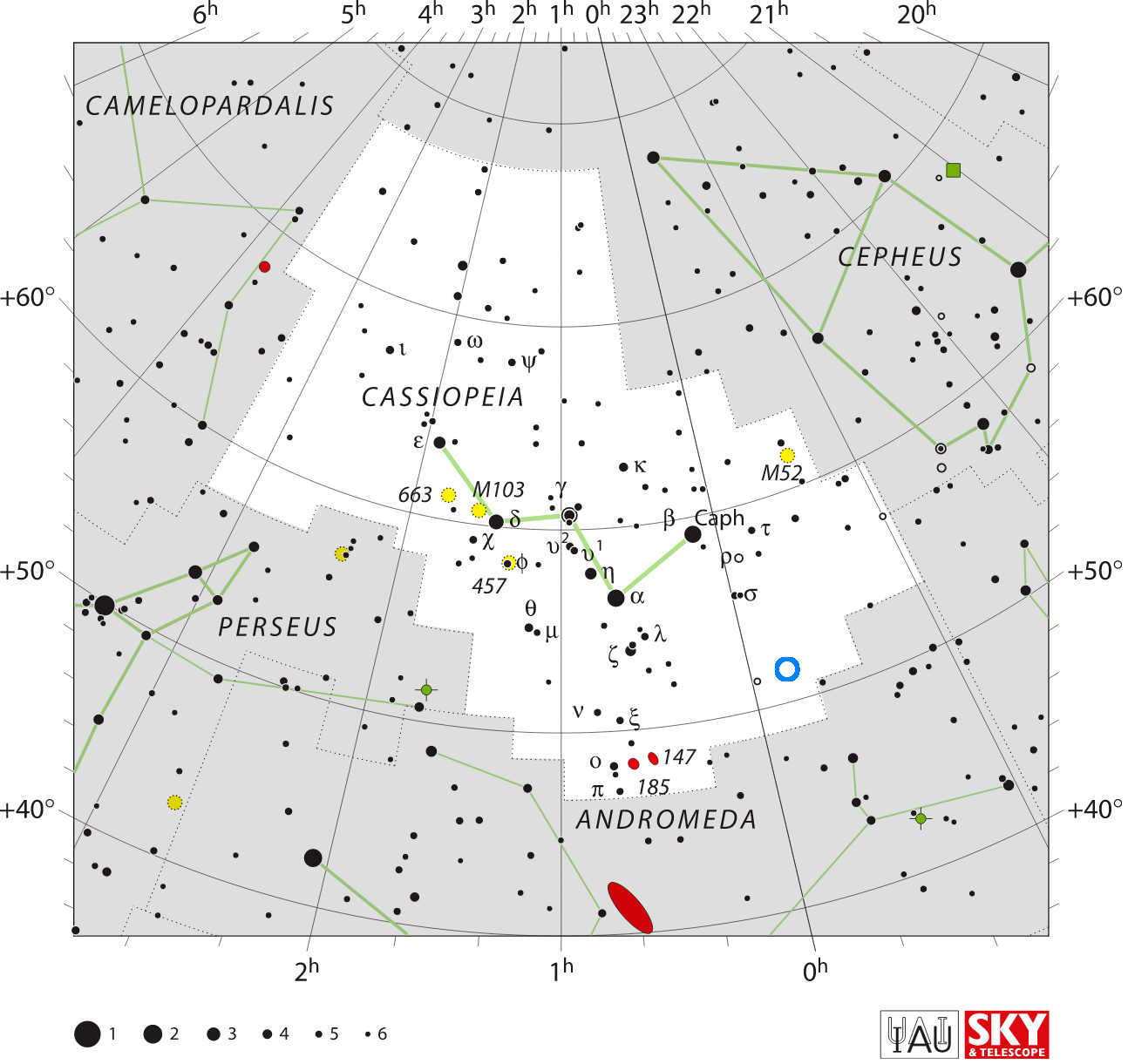
- The location of quasar 1ES 2344+514 (circled in blue)

Observation data (Epoch )
- Constellation: Cassiopeia
- Right ascension: 23^{h} 47^{m} 04.838^{s}
- Declination: +51° 42′ 17.88″
- Redshift: 0.044

Other designations
- TeV J2347+517, 2MASS J23470484+5142178, WISE J234704.83+514217.9, Gaia DR2 1945016660584494208

1ES 2344+514 is a highly variable bright blazar that was first detected on December 20, 1995 with its official discovery being announced in 1998. Since detection, flares have been frequently detected coming from this galaxy. It is more than 5 billion light years away from Earth. It was discovered by the Whipple Collaboration at the Whipple Observatory using a 10 meter gamma-ray telescope. 1ES 2344+514 is classified as an extreme high-frequency peaked BL Lacertae Object (HBL).
