= GX 339−4 =

X-ray binary in the constellation Ara

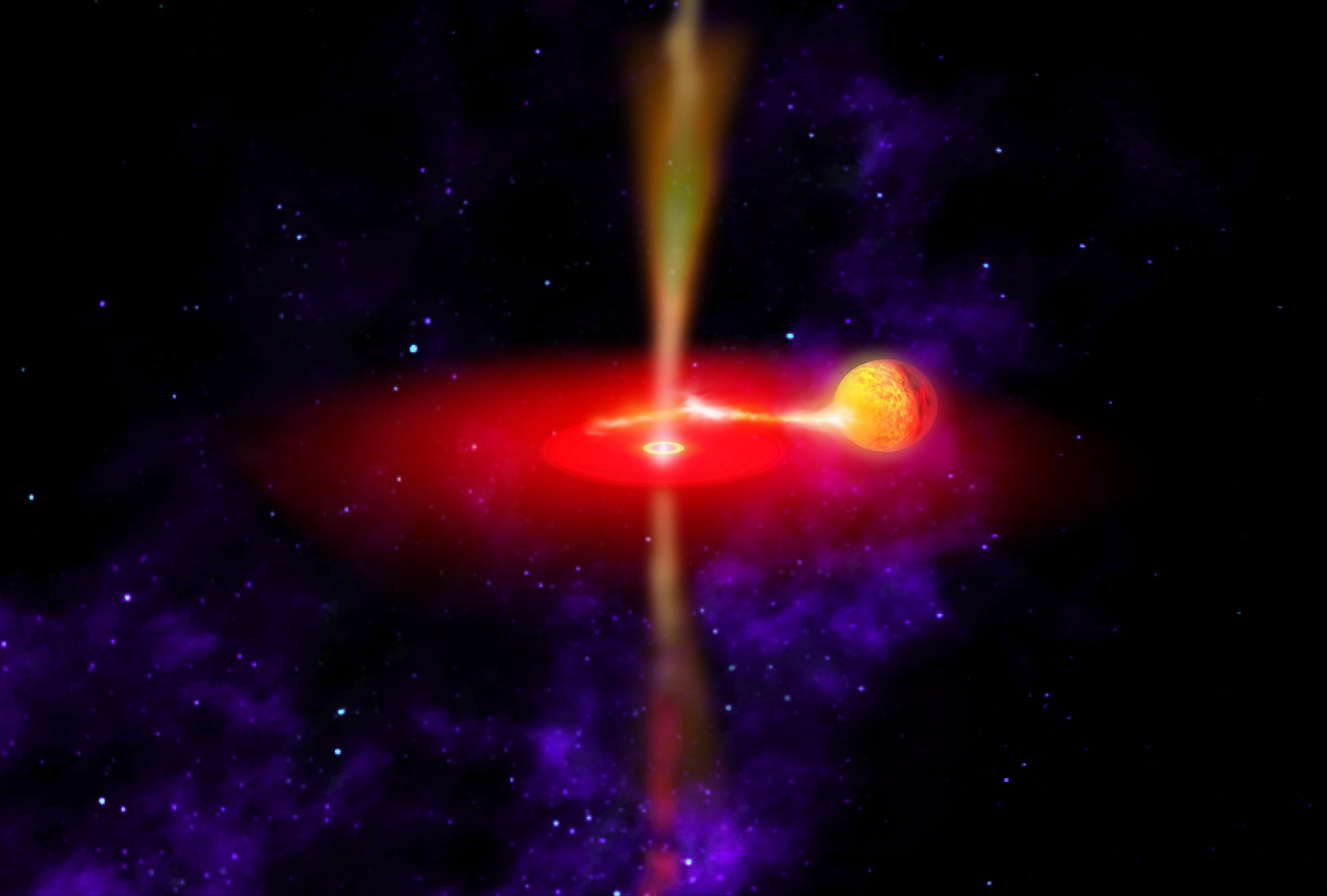
- GX 339−4 (artist's concept)

Observation data Epoch J2000 Equinox ICRS
- Constellation: Ara
- Right ascension: 17^{h} 02^{m} 49.5^{s}
- Declination: −48° 47′ 23″

Characteristics
- Apparent magnitude (B): 16.3
- Apparent magnitude (V): 15.5
- Apparent magnitude (J): 15.9
- Apparent magnitude (H): 15.4
- Apparent magnitude (K): 15.0
- Variable type: LMXB

Other designations
- V821 Ara, 4U 1658-48, 3A 1659-487, 1RXS J170248.5-484719, 2MASS 17024936-4847228

Database references
SIMBAD	data

GX 339−4 is a moderately strong variable galactic low-mass X-ray binary (LMXB) source and black hole candidate that flares from time to time. From spectroscopic measurements, the mass of the black-hole was found to be at least of 5.8 solar masses.

Thomas Henry Markert et al. discovered GX 339−4 in 1973, in data obtained by the MIT Cosmic Ray Experiment on OSO-7. An optical counterpoint to the X-ray source was found by Jonathan E. Grindlay in 1979, and it is optically variable. For that reason it was given a variable star designation, V821 Arae, in 1981.

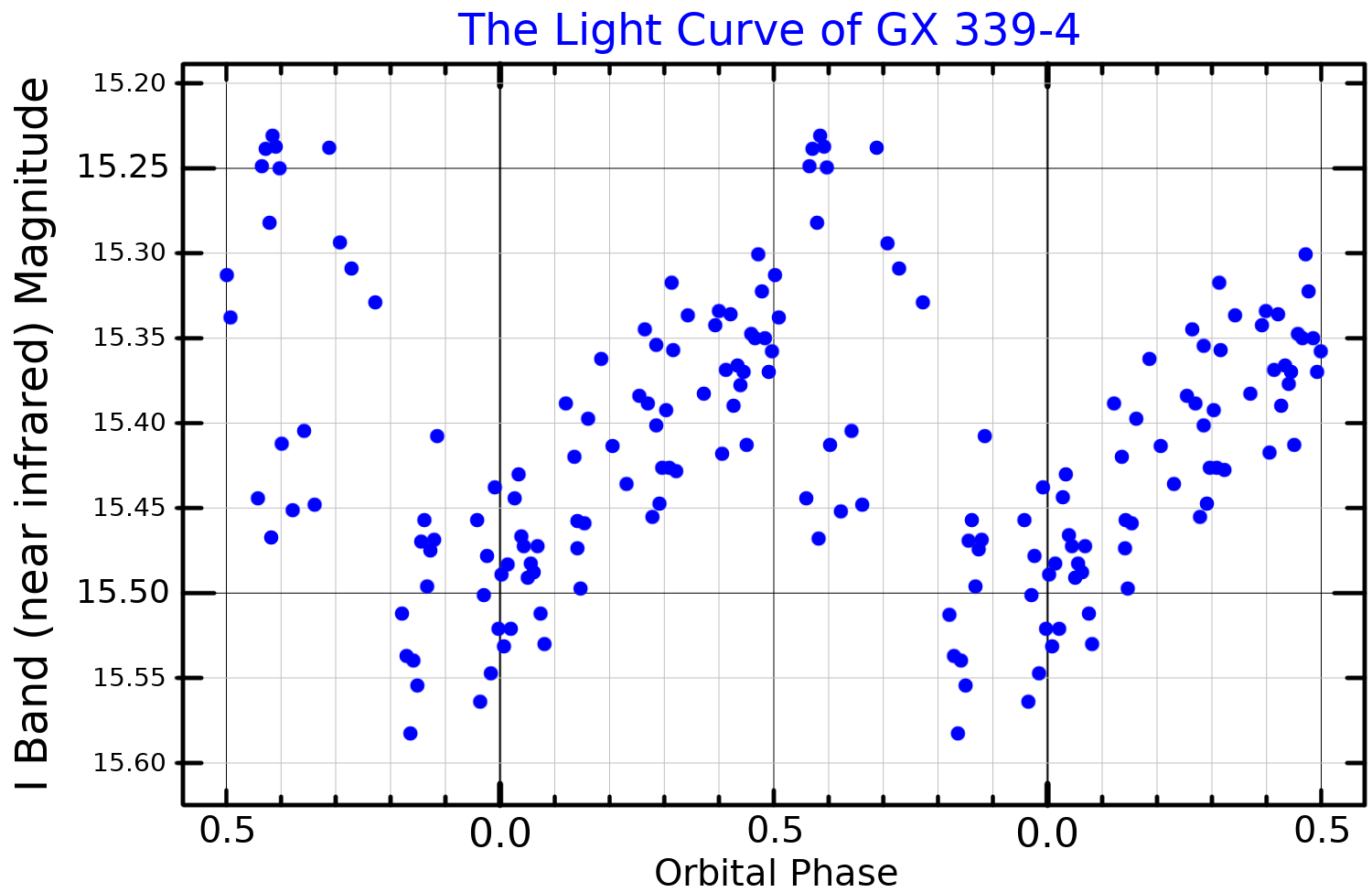
An I band light curve for GX 339−4, platted assuming an orbital period of 0.7 days. Adapted from Cowley et al. (2002)

During the outbursts GX 339−4 shows evolution of quasi-periodic oscillations (QPOs). In the rising phase the QPO frequency monotonically increase as the CENBOL propagates closer to the black hole and in the declining phase the QPO frequency monotonically decreases since the CENBOL recedes away from the black hole after viscosity is decreased. The frequency variation is thus well modeled by the propagating and oscillating shock in the sub-Keplerian flow. The entire spectrum also fits very well using a two component advective flow solution.

A strong, variable relativistic jet, emitting from radio to infrared wavelengths was observed by several studies.
