= NGC 821 =

Galaxy in the constellation Aries

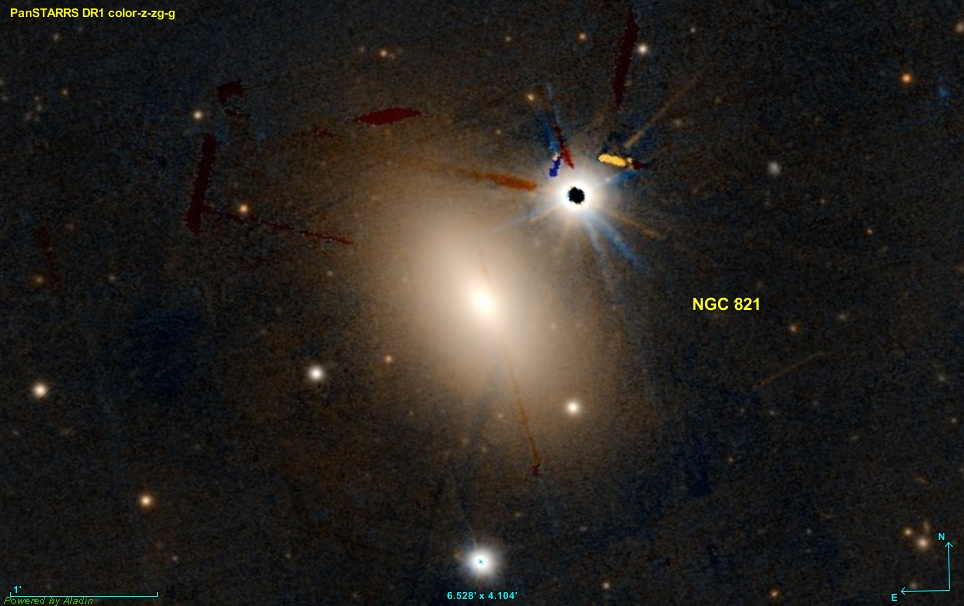
- Pan-STARRS image of NGC 821

Observation data (J2000 epoch)
- Constellation: Aries
- Right ascension: 02^{h} 08^{m} 21.150^{s}
- Declination: +10° 59′ 41.53″
- Redshift: 0.005814
- Heliocentric radial velocity: 1738 km/s
- Distance: 75.8 Mly (23.23 Mpc)
- Apparent magnitude (V): 11.31
- Apparent magnitude (B): 12.21

Characteristics
- Type: E6

Other designations
- UGC 1631, MCG +02-06-034, PGC 8160

NGC 821 is an elliptical galaxy in the constellation Aries. It is estimated to be about 80 million light-years from the Milky Way and has a diameter of approximately 55,000 light years. NGC 821 was discovered on September 4, 1786, by astronomer Wilhelm Herschel.

== See also ==
- List of NGC objects (1–1000)
