= EGSD2 J142033.66+525917.5 =

Active galactic nucleus

EGSD2 J142033.66+525917.5 is a dual-active galactic nucleus (AGN) at z-0.709 in the Extended Groth Strip.

== Description ==
The galaxy is heavily redshifted, and has an absolute magnitude of −21.0, with a rest frame colour of 1.38. The spectrum displays double peaked emission lines of great strength, suggesting two separate sources, and much weaker H-beta emission. The two peaks are separated by a velocity of about 630 km/s and are traced to 2 well-defined regions in space, both resolved in the DEIMOS spectrum, with a rough distance of about 3913 light years, or 1.2 kiloparsecs. The nucleus is in an early-type galaxy, with a possibly interrupted structure, and matching up to a remnant of a galactic merger in which energy loss has not appeared to have taken place.

== Discovery ==
The AGN was discovered with a series of observations of a one-dimensional Deep2 spectrum from the Keck II telescope at the W.M Keck observatory in Hawai'i. The outstanding properties of the spectrum was the pair of double-peaked emission lines, with respective wavelength ratios of Lambda-4959 and Lambda-5007. The peaks of the Lambda-5007 observation were about 17.8 angstroms away from each other. The spectrum also had a promising amount of H-beta emission, but it was unidentifiable due to Poisson Noise. There were no other emission lines, but the entirety of the observed wavelengths (6750-8980 angstroms) showed a great amount of stellar continuum absorption features.
