= OMEGACat BH-2 =

Binary system with a black hole in the Omega Centauri cluster

oMEGACat BH-2
- Image of the ω Centauri cluster, showing the location of the oMEGACat BH-2 system.

Observation data Epoch J2000 Equinox ICRS
- Constellation: Centaurus
- Right ascension: 13^{h} 26^{m} 49.1457528^{s}
- Declination: −47° 28′ 51.231396″

Characteristics

Visible star
- Evolutionary stage: Main sequence turnoff
- Apparent magnitude (F814W): 17.214
- B−V color index: 0.185

Black hole
- Evolutionary stage: Stellar black hole

Astrometry
Distance	17,919±199 (Note: The exact distance in light-years, according to the catalog by M. Häberle et al.) ly (5,494±61 pc)

Orbit
Period (P)	94+63 −42 yr
Semi-major axis (a)	31+15 −12″
Eccentricity (e)	0.72+0.08 −0.13
Longitude of the node (Ω)	2.87°
Periastron epoch (T)	2012.2+0.32 −0.36
Argument of periastron (ω) (secondary)	1.60°

Details

Black Hole
Mass	4.46+1.22 −1.01 M_{☉}

Visible star
Mass	0.78 M_{☉}

oMEGACat BH-2 is a binary system consisting of a stellar-mass black hole and a companion star, located in the central region of the Omega Centauri globular cluster, at a distance of 5,494 parsecs, or 17,919 light-years in the constellation Centaurus. The black hole in this system is the first one discovered in the Omega Centauri globular cluster.

== System characteristics ==
Animation of a star rotating around a stellar-mass black hole in the oMEGACat BH-2 system

oMEGACat BH-2 is classified as a long-period binary system consisting of a black hole with an estimated mass of 4.46+1.22
−1.01 M_{☉}, which is significantly lower than expected for a low-metallicity environment such as Omega Centauri, and a visible star at the main-sequence turnoff with a mass of 0.78 M_{☉}. Based on extensive data, the team determined that the visible star orbits oMEGACat BH-2 once every 94+63
−42 years, making it the longest-period black hole binary system known to date. The semi-major axis of the system is 31 AU, with a high orbital eccentricity of e = 0.72+0.08
−0.13. Despite the fact that the array of archival observations covers about a quarter of the system's orbital period, the high accuracy in determining the parameters is due to the recording of the periastron passage, where the radial velocity of the visible companion is maximal.

=== The fate of the system ===
Due to the large separation between the components, the pair is considered weakly gravitationally bound. Researchers have estimated that the projected lifespan of a system like oMEGACat BH-2 is approximately 800 million years. The binary is expected to disrupt due to dynamical scattering during close encounters with single stars or other binary systems.

== Discovery and observation history ==
Theoretical models of globular cluster dynamics suggest that, during the evolution of massive stars, Omega Centauri should contain approximately 10,000 smaller stellar-mass black holes. This population of black holes has not been detected in previous observations based on radial velocity measurements or searches for radio and X-ray emission from accreting matter.

The object was discovered as part of the international oMEGACat project, led by Nadine Neumayer and Anil Seth, which aimed to create a catalog of proper motions and spectra for 1.4 million stars in the cluster. A research team led by Matthew Whitaker from the University of Utah applied a method known as astrometry to measure the very small movements of stars over time. By analyzing more than 20 years of archival data from the Hubble Space Telescope and incorporating recent data from the James Webb Space Telescope to further refine the astrometric measurements, the team discovered a main sequence turnoff star moving in an elongated orbit around an invisible gravitational center. A previous study by another group of scientists had classified the hidden component as a neutron star. Based on archival astrometric measurements from Hubble (2002–2023) and high-precision near-infrared data from the James Webb Space Telescope, the University of Utah research team refined the mass of the invisible companion, ruling out the possibility of it being a neutron star. The results of the study were published on July 13, 2026, in The Astrophysical Journal Letters under the title A Long Period Stellar-mass Black Hole Binary in ω Centauri.

== See also ==
- Omega Centauri
- Stellar black hole
- Gaia BH1
