= NGC 4564 =

Elliptical galaxy in the constellation Virgo

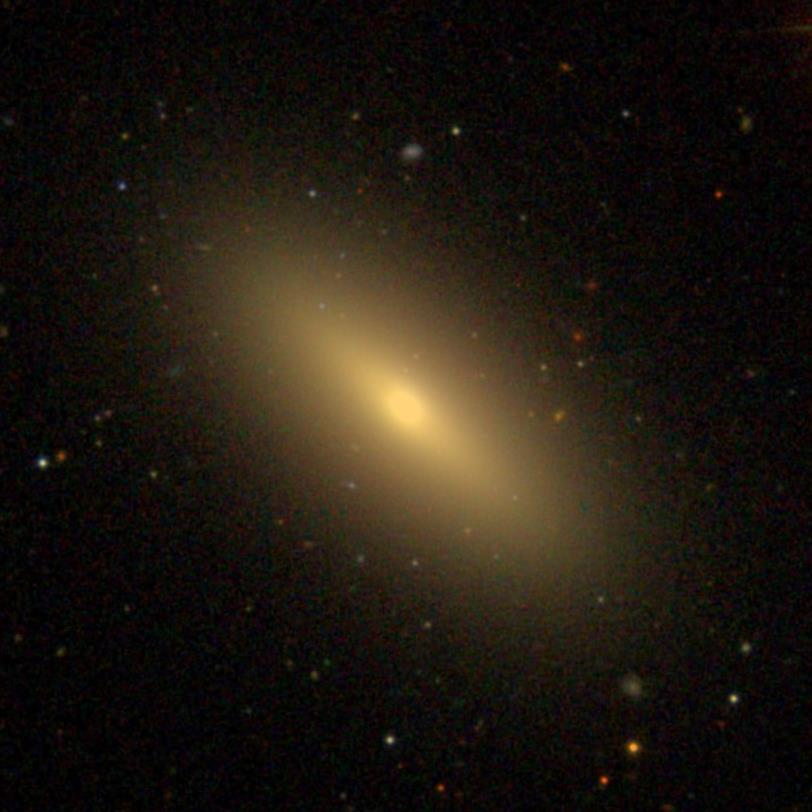
- NGC 4564 imaged by Sloan Digital Sky Survey

Observation data (J2000 epoch)
- Constellation: Virgo
- Right ascension: 12^{h} 36^{m} 26.9913^{s}
- Declination: +11° 26′ 21.266″
- Redshift: 0.003809
- Heliocentric radial velocity: 1142 km/s
- Distance: 57.2 Mly (17.55 Mpc)
- Group or cluster: Virgo Cluster
- Apparent magnitude (V): 12.05

Characteristics
- Type: E6
- Size: ~63,200 ly (19.38 kpc) (estimated)
- Apparent size (V): 3.5′ × 1.5′

Other designations
- VCC 1664, UGC 7773, MCG +02-32-150, PGC 42051, CGCG 070-186

NGC 4564 is an elliptical galaxy located about 57 million light-years away in the constellation Virgo. NGC 4564 was discovered by astronomer William Herschel on March 15, 1784. The galaxy is also a member of the Virgo Cluster.

NGC 4564 has an estimated population of 213 ± 31 globular clusters. It is the host of a supermassive black hole with an estimated mass of about 56 million suns (0.56+0.03
−0.08×10^{8} M_{☉}).

== Supernova ==
One supernova has been observed in NGC 4564: SN 1961H (type unknown, mag. 11.2) was discovered by Italian amateur astronomer Giuliano Romano on 2 May 1961. A spectrum taken indicated that it was probably of Type I.

== See also ==
- NGC 3115
- NGC 5102
- List of NGC objects (4001–5000)
