= Great Annihilator =

Microquasar

Observation data Epoch J2000 Equinox ICRS
- Constellation: Ophiuchus
- Right ascension: 17^{h} 43^{m} 54.83^{s}
- Declination: −29° 44′ 42.6″

Astrometry
Distance	16,000 ly (5,000 pc)

Database references
SIMBAD	data

1E1740.7-2942, or the Great Annihilator, is a Milky Way microquasar, located near the Galactic Center on the sky. It likely consists of a black hole and a companion star. It is one of the brightest X-ray sources in the region around the Galactic Center.

The object was first detected in soft X-rays by the Einstein Observatory, and later detected in hard X-rays by the Soviet Granat space observatory. Follow-up observations by the SIGMA detector on board Granat showed that the object was a variable emitter of massive amounts of photon pairs at 511 keV, which usually indicates the annihilation of an electron-positron pair. This led to the nickname, "Great Annihilator." Early observations also showed a spectrum similar to that of the Cygnus X-l, a black hole with a stellar companion, which suggested that Great Annihilator was also a stellar mass black hole.

The object also has a radio source counterpart that emits jets approximately 1.5 pc (5 ly) long. These jets are probably synchrotron emission from positron-electron pairs streaming out at high velocities from the source of antimatter. Modeling of the observed precession of these jets gives an object distance of approximately 5 kpc (or 16,000 ly). This means that while the object is likely located along our line of sight towards the center of the Milky Way, it may be closer to us than Sagittarius A*, the black hole at the center of our galaxy.
