= GRS 1124−683 =

Star in the constellation Musca

GU Muscae
Observation data Epoch J2000.0 Equinox ICRS
- Constellation: Musca
- Right ascension: 11^{h} 26^{m} 26.60^{s}
- Declination: −68° 40′ 32.3″
- Apparent magnitude (V): 13.3
Spectral type	K3V-K7V

Other designations
- GU Mus, GRS 1124−683, 1RXS J112623.5-684040, Nova Muscae 1991

Database references
SIMBAD	data

The gamma-ray and X-ray source GRS 1124−683, discovered by the Granat mission and Ginga, is a system containing a black hole candidate. The system also goes by the name X-ray Nova Muscae 1991 or GU Muscae. These two orbiting X-ray telescopes discovered the system when the system produced an outburst of X-rays on January 9, 1991.

== Black hole system ==
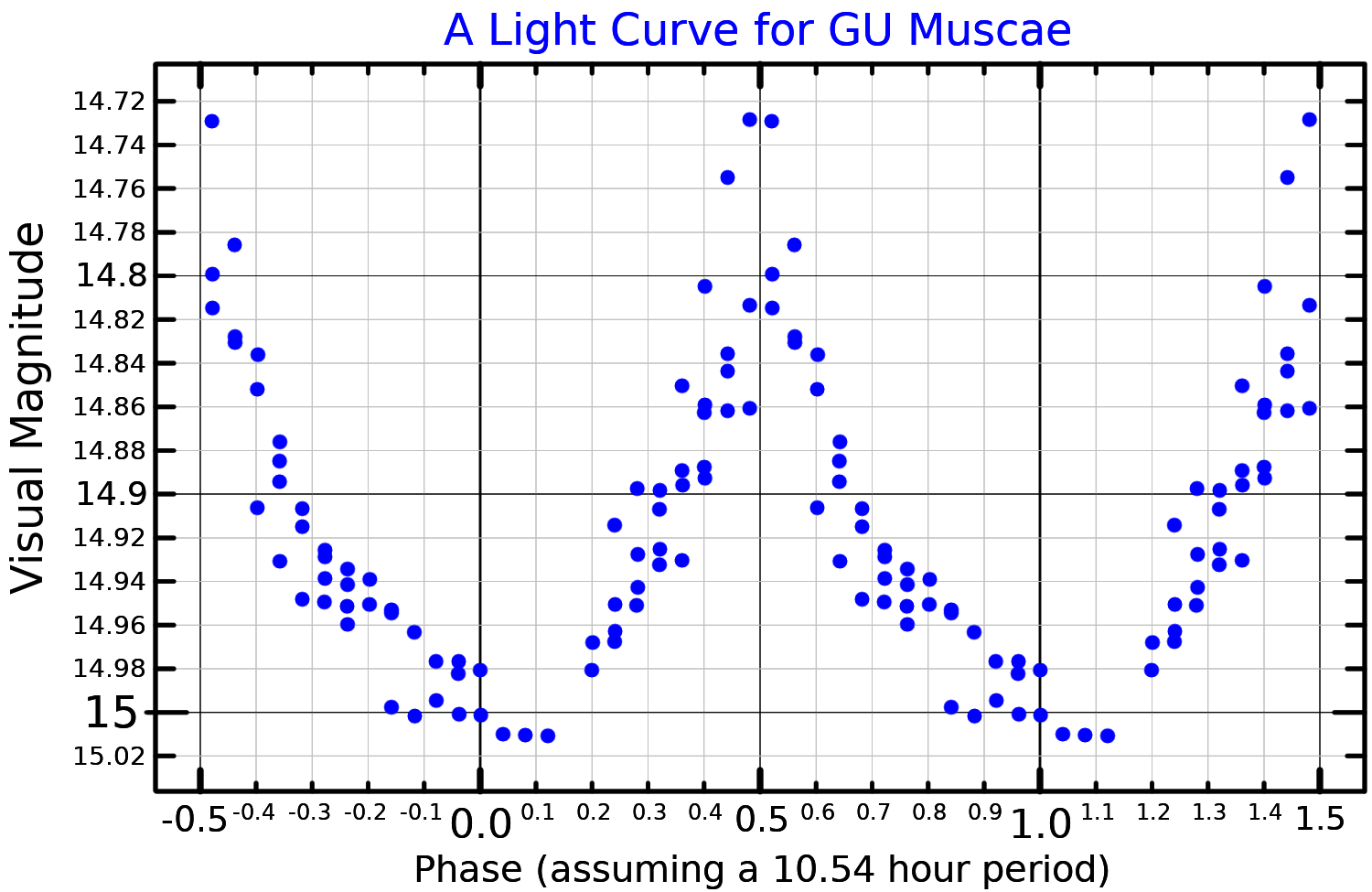
A visual band light curve for GU Muscae, adapted from Bailyn (1992)

It is one of several likely black hole systems that are classified as X-ray novae. Such a nova periodically produces bright outbursts of X-rays, along with visible light and other forms of energy.

In such a system, a black hole pulls gas from the surface of a companion star. The gas forms a thin disk around the black hole, known as an accretion disk. In an X-ray nova, the flow of gas is fairly thin and slow, so the accretion disk remains relatively cool, and little gas falls into the black hole.

In the case of GU Muscae, the black hole is about seven times as massive as the Sun, while the companion is three-quarters as massive as the Sun. The companion is also cooler than the Sun, so its surface is redder, and the star's total luminosity is only one-third that of the Sun's. Its outer layers probably were blown away by the supernova explosion that gave birth to the black hole. The two stars orbit each other every 10.4 hours at a distance of roughly 2 million miles (3.2 million km).

== Spectral radiance ==
During the January 20–21, 1991, outburst which led to its discovery, radiation was produced by positron annihilation. The SIGMA telescope aboard GRANAT detected a relatively narrow variable emission line near 500 keV in the spectrum. From January 9 – August 14, 1991, the spectrum had a strong hard component extending up to ~300 keV.
