= V691 Coronae Australis =

Star in the constellation Corona Australis

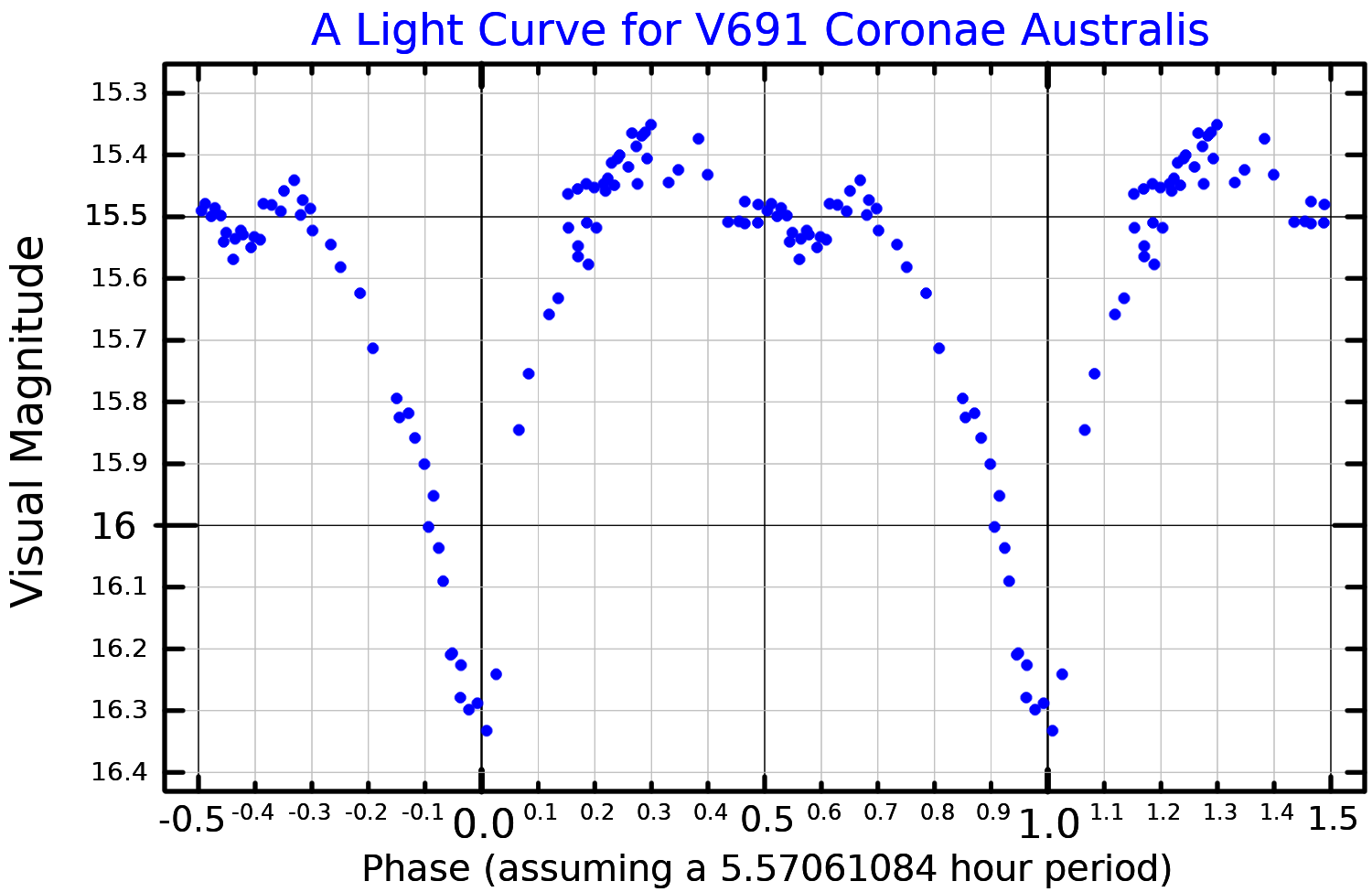
- A visual band light curve for V691 Coronae Australis, adapted from Cowley et al. (2003)

Observation data Epoch J2000 Equinox ICRS
- Constellation: Corona Australis
- Right ascension: 18^{h} 25^{m} 46.8186^{s}
- Declination: −37° 06′ 18.529″
- Apparent magnitude (V): 15.1

Astrometry
Radial velocity (R_{v})	−91.0 km/s
Proper motion (μ)	RA: −9.222 mas/yr Dec.: −2.542 mas/yr
Parallax (π)	0.1205±0.0577 mas
Distance	approx. 30,000 ly (approx. 8,000 pc)

Details

Neutron star
Mass	1.14–2.32 M_{☉}

Database references
SIMBAD	data

X1822–371, associated with the optically visible star V691 Coronae Australis (abbreviated V691 CrA), is a neutron-star X-ray binary system at a distance of approximately 2-2.5 kiloparsecs. It is known to have a high inclination of i = 82.5°± 1.5°. This source displays relatively high brightness in the optical wavelengths when compared to the X-ray, making it a prototypical Accretion Disk Corona (ADC) source, i.e. a source with a corona extending above and below its accretion disk. The only-partial eclipses in its light curve, even at such a high inclination, support this hypothesis. Estimates of the mass of its neutron star lies between 1.14–2.32 solar masses. The optical spectrum of X1822–371 displays strong Hα, Hβ, He I, He II and Bowen Blend features. These features have been extensively studied using the technique of Doppler tomography.

Keith O. Masson et al. announced that the star is a variable star, in 1979. It was given its variable star designation in 1981.
