= CXOU J132527.6-430023 =

Black hole candidate

CXOU J132527.6-430023 is a ULX stellar mass Transient Sub-Eddington black hole candidate in the nearby galaxy of NGC 5128 (Centaurus A).

== Discovery ==
CXOU J132527.6−430023 was discovered in 2007 during a series of observations conducted by the Chandra X-ray Observatory of Centaurus A. The source brightened by more than two orders of magnitude between March and June 2007, reaching a peak unabsorbed luminosity of ~2 × 10^{38} erg/s, before fading below detectability in subsequent observations.
