= Superluminal motion =

Apparent faster-than-light motion of distant astronomical objects

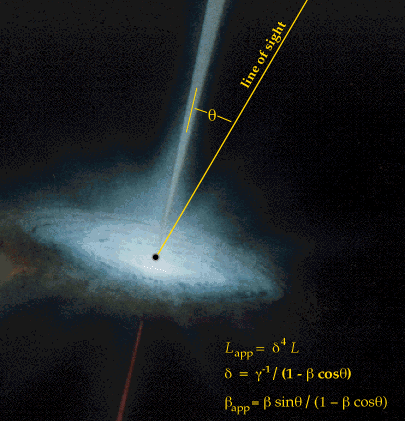
Superluminal motion

In astronomy, superluminal motion is the apparently faster-than-light motion seen in some radio galaxies, BL Lac objects, quasars, blazars and recently also in some galactic sources called microquasars. Bursts of energy moving out along the relativistic jets emitted from these objects can have a proper motion that appears to have speed greater than the speed of light. All of these sources are thought to contain a black hole, responsible for the ejection of mass at high velocities. Light echoes can also produce apparent superluminal motion.

== Explanation ==
Superluminal motion occurs as a special case of a more general phenomenon arising from the difference between the apparent speed of distant objects moving across the sky and their actual speed as measured at the source.

In tracking the movement of such objects across the sky, their speed can be calculated by simply dividing distance by time. If the distance of the object from the Earth is known and the angular speed of the object can be measured, then the speed can be calculated as:

apparent speed = distance to object × angular speed.

But this calculation does not yield the actual speed of the object, as it assumes the light travels the same amount of time for each of two (or more) separate observations. But when there is a velocity component directed towards the observer, light that is emitted later has to travel a shorter distance, and thus has a shorter travel time. For example, in a jet moving towards the observer at 0.9c and laterally at 0.2c, light emitted a year later will be emitted from a point 0.2 LY to the side, but it will also be 0.9LY closer to the observer, so it will only arrive 0.1 years later. Thus the observer will see, over the course of a tenth of a year, the source of the light move by 0.2 LY, an apparent motion of twice the speed of light.

The effect grows more pronounced the greater the velocity component directed towards the observer. This means that in most cases, 'superluminal' objects are traveling almost directly towards the Earth. However it is not strictly necessary for this to be the case, and superluminal motion can still be observed in objects with appreciable velocities not directed towards the Earth.

Superluminal motion is most often observed in two opposing jets emanating from the core of a star or black hole. In this case, one jet is moving away from and one towards the Earth. If Doppler shifts are observed in both sources, the velocity and the distance can be determined independently of other observations.

=== Some contrary evidence ===
As early as 1983, at the "superluminal workshop" held at Jodrell Bank Observatory, referring to the seven then-known superluminal jets,

Schilizzi ... presented maps of arc-second resolution [showing the large-scale outer jets] ... which ... have revealed outer double structure in all but one (3C 273) of the known superluminal sources. An embarrassment is that the average projected size [on the sky] of the outer structure is no smaller than that of the normal radio-source population.

In other words, the jets are evidently not, on average, close to the Earth's line-of-sight. (Their apparent length would appear much shorter if they were.)

In 1993, Thomson et al. suggested that the (outer) jet of the quasar 3C 273 is nearly collinear to the Earth's line-of-sight. Superluminal motion of up to ~9.6c has been observed along the (inner) jet of this quasar.

Superluminal motion of up to 6c has been observed in the inner parts of the jet of M87. To explain this in terms of the "narrow-angle" model, the jet must be no more than 19° from the Earth's line-of-sight. But evidence suggests that the jet is in fact at about 43° to the Earth's line-of-sight. The same group of scientists later revised that finding and argue in favour of a superluminal bulk movement in which the jet is embedded.

Suggestions of turbulence and/or "wide cones" in the inner parts of the jets have been put forward to try to counter such problems, and there seems to be some evidence for this.

==== Signal velocity ====
The model identifies a difference between the information carried by the wave at its signal velocity c, and the information about the wave front's apparent rate of change of position. If a light pulse is envisaged in a wave guide (glass tube) moving across an observer's field of view, the pulse can only move at c through the guide. If that pulse is also directed towards the observer, he will receive that wave information, at c. If the wave guide is moved in the same direction as the pulse, the information on its position, passed to the observer as lateral emissions from the pulse, changes. He may see the rate of change of position as apparently representing motion faster than c when calculated, like the edge of a shadow across a curved surface. This is a different signal, containing different information, to the pulse and does not break the second postulate of special relativity. c is strictly maintained in all local fields.

== Derivation of the apparent velocity ==
A relativistic jet coming out of the center of an active galactic nucleus is moving along AB with a velocity v, and is observed from the point O. At time $t_1$ a light ray leaves the jet from point A and another ray leaves at time $t_2=t_1+\delta t$ from point B. An observer at O receives the rays at time $t_1^\prime$ and $t_2^\prime$ respectively. The angle $\phi$ is small enough that the two distances marked $D_L$ can be considered equal.

$$AB = v \, \delta t$$
$$AC = v \, \delta t \cos\theta$$
$$BC = v \, \delta t \sin\theta$$
$$t_2-t_1 = \delta t$$

$$t_1' = t_1 + \frac{D_L + v \, \delta t \cos\theta}{c}$$
$$t_2' = t_2 + \frac{D_L}{c}$$

$\delta t' = t_2' - t_1' = t_2 - t_1 - \frac{v \, \delta t \cos\theta}{c} = \delta t - \frac{v \, \delta t \cos\theta}{c} = \delta t (1-\beta \cos\theta)$, where $\beta=v/c$

$$\delta t = \frac{\delta t'}{1-\beta\cos\theta}$$

$$BC = D_L\sin\phi \approx \phi D_L = v \, \delta t \sin\theta \Rightarrow \phi D_L = v\sin\theta\frac{\delta t'}{1-\beta\cos\theta}$$

Apparent transverse velocity along $CB$, $v_\text{T} = \frac{\phi D_L}{\delta t'}=\frac{v\sin\theta}{1-\beta\cos\theta}$

$$\beta_\text{T} = \frac{v_\text{T}}{c} = \frac{\beta\sin\theta}{1-\beta\cos\theta}.$$

The apparent transverse velocity is maximal for angle ($0 <\beta < 1$ is used)

$$\frac{\partial\beta_\text{T}}{\partial\theta} = \frac{\partial}{\partial\theta} \left[\frac{\beta\sin\theta}{1-\beta\cos\theta}\right] = \frac{\beta\cos\theta}{1-\beta\cos\theta} - \frac{(\beta\sin\theta)^2}{(1-\beta\cos\theta)^2} = 0$$

$$\Rightarrow \beta\cos\theta(1-\beta\cos\theta)^2 = (1 - \beta\cos\theta) (\beta\sin\theta)^2$$

$$\Rightarrow \beta\cos\theta (1-\beta\cos\theta) = (\beta\sin\theta)^2 \Rightarrow \beta\cos\theta - \beta^2\cos^2\theta = \beta^2\sin^2\theta \Rightarrow \cos\theta_\text{max} = \beta$$

$\Rightarrow \sin\theta_\text{max} = \sqrt{1-\cos^2\theta_\text{max}} = \sqrt{1-\beta^2} = \frac{1}{\gamma}\,$, where $\gamma=\frac{1}{\sqrt{1-\beta^2}}$

$$\therefore \beta_\text{T}^\text{max} = \frac{\beta\sin\theta_\text{max}}{1-\beta\cos\theta_\text{max}} = \frac{\beta/\gamma}{1-\beta^2} = \beta\gamma$$

If $\gamma \gg 1$ (i.e. when velocity of jet is close to the velocity of light) then $\beta_\text{T}^\text{max} > 1$ despite the fact that $\beta < 1$. And of course $\beta_\text{T} > 1$ means that the apparent transverse velocity along $CB$, the only velocity on the sky that can be measured, is larger than the velocity of light in vacuum, i.e. the motion is apparently superluminal.

== History ==
The apparent superluminal motion in the faint nebula surrounding Nova Persei was first observed in 1901 by Charles Dillon Perrine. "Mr. Perrine's photograph of November 7th and 8th, 1901, secured with the Crossley Reflector, led to the remarkable discovery that the masses of nebulosity were apparently in motion, with a speed perhaps several hundred times as great as hitherto observed." "Using the 36-in. telescope (Crossley), he discovered the apparent superluminal motion of the expanding light bubble around Nova Persei (1901). Thought to be a nebula, the visual appearance was actually caused by light from the nova event reflected from the surrounding interstellar medium as the light moved outward from the star. Perrine studied this phenomenon using photographic, spectroscopic, and polarization techniques."

Superluminal motion was first observed in 1902 by Jacobus Kapteyn in the ejecta of the nova GK Persei, which had exploded in 1901. His discovery was published in the German journal Astronomische Nachrichten, and received little attention from English-speaking astronomers until many decades later.

Following a 1939 paper by Couderc, in 1966, Martin Rees pointed out that "an object moving relativistically in suitable directions may appear to a distant observer to have a transverse velocity much greater than the velocity of light". In 1969 and 1970 such sources were found as very distant astronomical radio sources, such as radio galaxies and quasars, and were called superluminal sources. The discovery was the result of a new technique called Very Long Baseline Interferometry, which allowed astronomers to set limits to the angular size of components and to determine positions to better than milli-arcseconds, and in particular to determine the change in positions on the sky, called proper motions, in a timespan of typically years. The apparent speed, which could be up to six times the speed of light, is obtained by multiplying the observed proper motion by the distance.

In the introduction to a workshop on superluminal radio sources, Pearson and Zensus reported

The first indications of changes in the structure of some sources were obtained by an American-Australian team in a series of transpacific VLBI observations between 1968 and 1970 (Gubbay et al. 1969). Following the early experiments, they had realised the potential of the NASA tracking antennas for VLBI measurements and set up an interferometer operating between California and Australia. The change in the source visibility that they measured for 3C 279, combined with changes in total flux density, indicated that a component first seen in 1969 had reached a diameter of about 1 milliarcsecond, implying expansion at an apparent velocity of at least twice the speed of light. Aware of Rees's model, (Moffet et al. 1972) concluded that their measurement presented evidence for relativistic expansion of this component. This interpretation, although by no means unique, was later confirmed, and in hindsight it seems fair to say that their experiment was the first interferometric measurement of superluminal expansion.

In 1994, a galactic speed record was obtained with the discovery of a superluminal source in the Milky Way, the cosmic x-ray source GRS 1915+105. The expansion occurred on a much shorter timescale. Several separate blobs were seen to expand in pairs within weeks by typically 0.5 arcsec. Because of the analogy with quasars, this source was called a microquasar.

== See also ==
- EPR paradox
- Quantum entanglement
- Superluminal communication
- Ultra-high-energy cosmic ray
- Special relativity
- List of quasars § List of quasars with apparent superluminal jet motion
