= GRS 1915+105 =

Binary system in the constellation Aquila

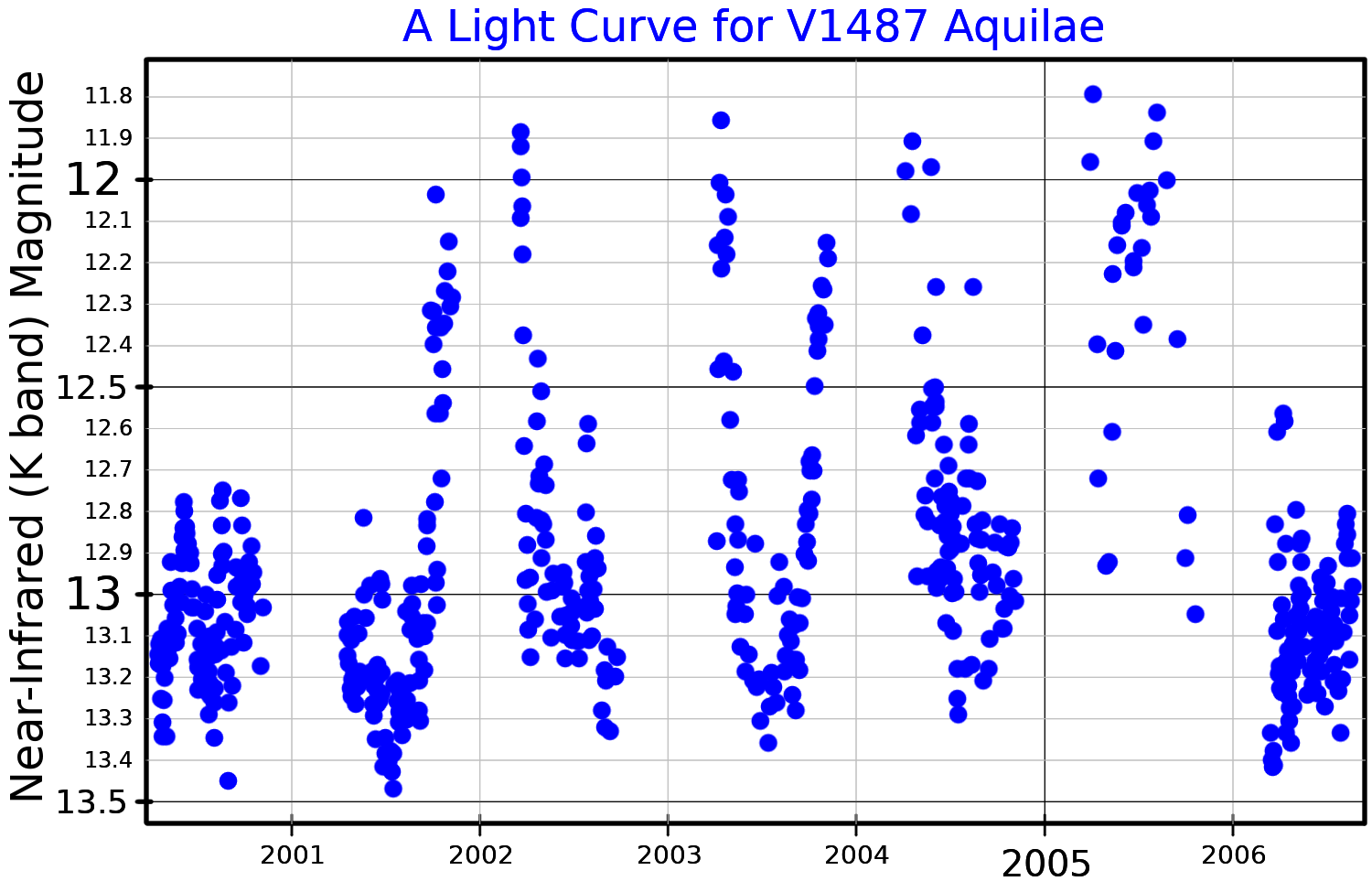
- A near-infrared (K band) light curve for V1487 Aquilae, adapted from Neil et al. (2007)

Observation data Epoch J2000.0 Equinox ICRS
- Constellation: Aquila
- Right ascension: 19^{h} 15^{m} 11.6^{s}
- Declination: +10° 56′ 44″

Characteristics
- Evolutionary stage: Microquasar

Astrometry
Parallax (π)	0.120±0.009 mas
Distance	28,000 ly (8,600+2,000 −1,600 pc)

Details

Black hole
Mass	12.4+2.0 −1.8 M_{☉}

Other designations
- V1487 Aquilae, Granat 1915+105, Nova Aquilae 1992, Granat 1915+10, INTEGRAL1 112

Database references
SIMBAD	data

GRS 1915+105 or V1487 Aquilae is an X-ray binary star system containing a main sequence star and a black hole. Transfer of material from the star to the black hole generates a relativistic jet, making this a microquasar system. The jet exhibits apparent superluminal motion.

It was discovered on August 15, 1992 by the WATCH all-sky monitor aboard Granat. "GRS" stands for "GRANAT source", "1915" is the right ascension (19 hours and 15 minutes) and "105" reflects the approximate declination (10 degrees and 56 arcminutes). The near-infrared counterpart was determined by spectroscopic observations.

The binary system lies 11,000 parsecs away in Aquila. The black hole in GRS 1915+105 is 10 to 18 solar masses. The black hole rotates at least 950 times per second, giving it a spin parameter >0.82 (1.0 is the theoretical maximum).

== Galactic superluminal source ==
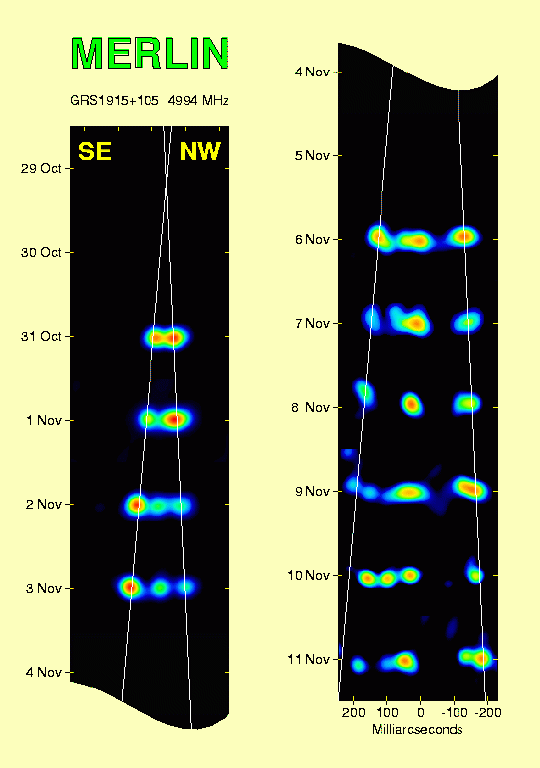
A sequence of MERLIN observation of the X-ray binary GRS 1915+105 taken over a few days.

In 1994, GRS 1915+105 became the first known galactic source that ejects material with apparent superluminal motion velocities.

Observations with high resolution radio telescopes such as VLA, MERLIN, and VLBI show a bi-polar outflow of charged particles, which emit synchrotron radiation at radio frequencies. These studies have shown that the apparent superluminal motion is due to a relativistic effect known as relativistic aberration, where the intrinsic velocity of ejecta is actually about 90% the speed of light.

== Growth regulation ==
Repeat observations by the Chandra X-Ray Observatory over the period of a decade have revealed what may be a mechanism for self-regulation of the rate of growth of GRS 1915+105. The jet of materials being ejected is occasionally choked off by a hot wind blowing off the accretion disk. The wind deprives the jet of materials needed to sustain it. When the wind dies down, the jet returns.

== See also ==
- GRO J1655-40
