= Soft X-ray transient =

Type of x-ray binary

Artist's impression of SXT GRO J1655-40

Soft X-ray transients (SXTs), also known as X-ray novae and black hole X-ray transients, are composed of a compact object (most commonly a black hole but sometimes a neutron star) and a low-mass main-sequence star (i.e. a star with a mass less than the Sun's mass). These objects show dramatic changes in their X-ray emission, probably produced by variable transfer of mass from the normal star to the compact object, a process called accretion. In effect the compact object "gobbles up" the normal star, and the X-ray emission can provide the best view of how this process occurs. The "soft" name arises because in many cases there is strong soft (i.e. low-energy) X-ray emission from an accretion disk close to the compact object, although there are exceptions which are quite hard.

Soft X-ray transients Cen X-4 and Aql X-1 were discovered by Hakucho, Japan's first X-ray astronomy satellite to be X-ray bursters.

During active accretion episodes, called "outbursts", SXTs are bright (with typical luminosities above 10^{37} erg/s). Between these episodes, when the accretion is absent, SXTs are usually very faint, or even unobservable; this is called the "quiescent" state.

In the "outburst" state the brightness of the system increases by a factor of 100–10000 in both X-rays and optical. During outburst, a bright SXT is the brightest object in the X-ray sky, and the apparent magnitude is about 12. The SXTs have outbursts with intervals of decades or longer, as only a few systems have shown two or more outbursts. The system fades back to quiescence in a few months. During the outburst, the X-ray spectrum is "soft" or dominated by low-energy X-rays, hence the name Soft X-ray transients.

SXTs are quite rare; about 100 systems are known. SXTs are a class of low-mass X-ray binaries. A typical SXT contains a K-type subgiant or dwarf that is transferring mass to a compact object through an accretion disk. In some cases the compact object is a neutron star, but black holes are more common. The type of compact object can be determined by observation of the system after an outburst; residual thermal emission from the surface of a neutron star will be seen whereas a black hole will not show residual emission. During "quiescence" mass is accumulating to the disk, and during outburst most of the disk falls into the black hole. The outburst is triggered as the density in the accretion disk exceeds a critical value. High density increases viscosity, which results in heating of the disk. Increasing temperature ionizes the gas, increasing the viscosity, and the instability increases and propagates throughout the disk. As the instability reaches the inner accretion disk, the X-ray luminosity rises and outburst begins. The outer disk is further heated by intense radiation from the inner accretion disk. A similar runaway heating mechanism operates in dwarf novae.

Some SXTs in the quiescent state show thermal X-ray radiation from the surface of a neutron star with typical luminosities ~(10^{32}—10^{34}) erg/s. In so called "quasi-persistent SXTs", whose periods of accretion and quiescence are particularly long (of the order of years), the cooling of the accretion-heated neutron-star crust can be observed in quiescence. Analyzing the quiescent thermal states of the SXTs and their crust cooling, one can test the physical properties of the superdense matter in the neutron stars.

== See also ==
- X-ray astronomy
- X-ray burster
