= GRO J1655−40 =

Binary star

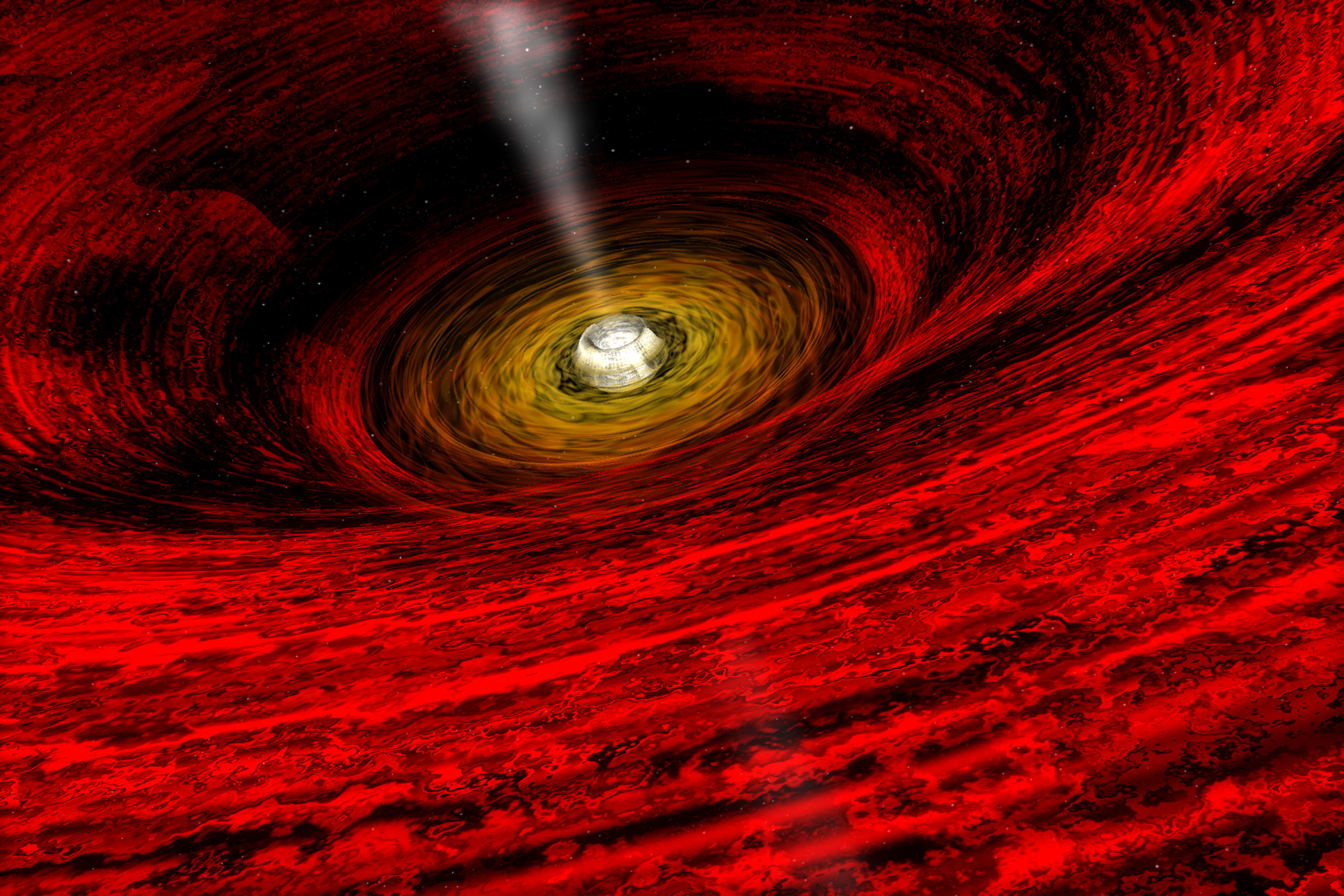
- An artist's impression of GRO J1655−40

Observation data Epoch J2000.0 Equinox ICRS
- Constellation: Scorpius
- Right ascension: 16^{h} 54^{m} 00.14^{s}
- Declination: −39° 50′ 44.9″
- Apparent magnitude (V): 14.0 - 17.3

Characteristics
- Spectral type: F5IV

Astrometry
Distance	10,400 ± 650 ly

Orbit
Inclination (i)	69.5±0.08°

Details

Donor Star
Mass	2.34±0.12 M_{☉}
Luminosity	41 L_{☉}
Temperature	6000–8000 K

Black Hole
Mass	7.02±0.22 M_{☉}

Other designations
- V1033 Sco, GRO J1655−40

Database references
SIMBAD	data

GRO J1655−40 is a binary star consisting of an evolved F-type primary star and a massive, unseen companion, which orbit each other once every 2.6 days in the constellation of Scorpius. Gas from the surface of the visible star is accreted onto the dark companion, which appears to be a stellar black hole with six times the mass of the Sun. The optical companion of this low-mass X-ray binary is a subgiant F star.

GRO J1655−40 was discovered by the Compton Gamma Ray Observatory on July 27, 1994. An optical counterpart to the gamma ray source was identified in August of the same year, by Jerome A. Orisz, and it was found to be a variable star.

Along with GRS 1915+105, GRO J1655−40 is one of at least two galactic "microquasars" that may provide a link between the supermassive black holes generally believed to power extragalactic quasars and more local accreting black hole systems. In particular, both display the radio jets characteristic of many active galactic nuclei.

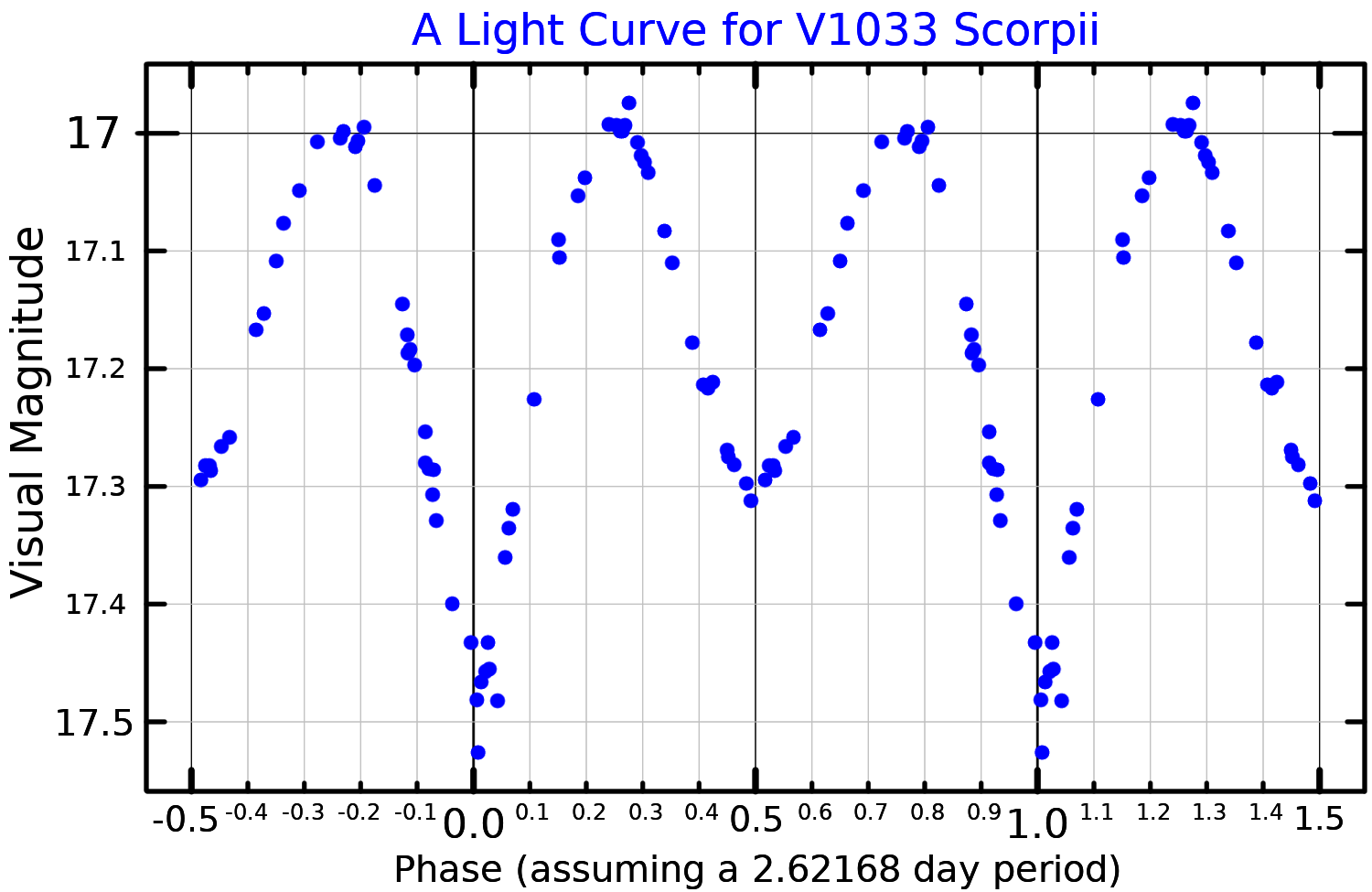
A visual band light curve for V1033 Scorpii (GRO J1655−40) in its quiescent state, adapted from van der Hooft et al. (1997)

The distance from the Solar System is probably about 11,000 light years, or approximately half-way from the Sun to the Galactic Center, but a closer distance of ~2800 ly is not ruled out. GRO J1655−40 and its companion are moving through the Milky Way at around 112 km/s (250,000 miles per hour), in a galactic orbit that depends on its exact distance, but is mostly interior to the "Solar circle", d~8,500 pc, and within 150 pc (~500 ly) of the galactic plane. For comparison, the Sun and other nearby stars have typical speeds on the order of 20 km/s relative to the average velocity of stars moving with the galactic disk's rotation in the solar neighborhood, which supports the idea that the black hole formed from the collapse of the core of a massive star. As the core collapsed, its outer layers exploded as a supernova. Such explosions often seem to leave the remnant system moving through the galaxy with unusually high speed.

The outburst source was found to exhibit quasi-periodic oscillations (QPOs) whose frequency increases monotonically during the rising phase of the outburst and with monotonically decreasing frequency in the declining phase of the outburst. This can be easily modeled assuming propagation of an oscillating shock wave: steadily going closer to the black hole due to rise in the Keplerian component rate in the rising phase and going away from the black hole as viscosity is withdrawn in the declining phase. The shock appears to be propagating at a speed of a few meters per second.

== See also ==
- List of nearest known black holes
- NGC 6242
