= Microquasar =

Miniature analogue of a quasar caused by black hole accretion

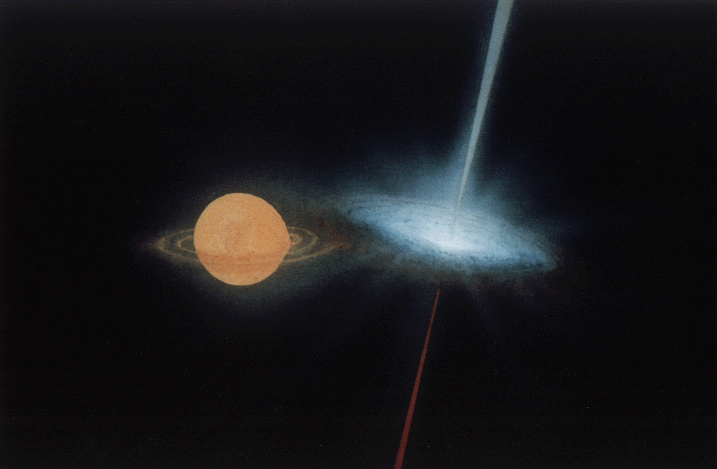
Artist's impression of the microquasar SS 433

A microquasar, a smaller version of a quasar, is a compact region surrounding a stellar black hole with a mass several times that of its companion star, observable in sufficient detail, in our own or nearby galaxy. The matter being pulled from the companion star forms an accretion disk around the black hole. This accretion disk may become so hot, due to friction, that it begins to emit X-rays. The disk also projects narrow streams or "jets" of subatomic particles at near-light speed, generating a strong radio wave emission.

== Overview ==
In 1979, SS 433, in our own galaxy, became the first microquasar to be discovered, when Margon et al. observed its relativistic jets. It was thought to be the most exotic case until similar objects such as GRS 1915+105 were confirmed in 1994.

In some cases, blobs or "knots" of brighter plasma within the jets appear to be traveling faster than the speed of light, an optical illusion called superluminal motion which is caused by sub-light-speed particles being projected at a small angle relative to the direction to the observer.

The 1996 Bruno Rossi Prize of the American Astronomical Society was awarded to Felix Mirabel and Luis Rodríguez for their discovery of the superluminal motion of radio knots in GRS 1915+105, as well as the discovery of double-sided radio jets from galactic sources 1E1740.7-2942 and GRS 1758-258.

Due to the smaller size of microquasars, many of the effects are scaled differently in relation to normal quasars. In quasars, the mean temperature of the accretion disk is several thousand degrees, while in a microquasar the mean temperature is several million degrees. The average size of the accretion disk of a quasar is 1 billion square kilometres (390 million square miles), whereas in microquasars the average size is only 1000 km^{2} (390 sq mi). Quasars can project jets up to several million light-years, whereas microquasars can project them only a few light-years; however, the "knots" within the jets of microquasars can exhibit a proper motion (angular motion across the sky) on the order of a thousand times faster than that of knots within a quasar jet because observed microquasars (being within the Milky Way galaxy) are at typical distances on the order of kiloparsecs, rather than hundreds of megaparsecs to several gigaparsecs.

== See also ==
- List of microquasars
