= Tolman–Oppenheimer–Volkoff limit =

Upper bound to the mass of cold, nonrotating neutron stars

The Tolman–Oppenheimer–Volkoff limit (or TOV limit) is an upper bound to the mass of cold, non-rotating neutron stars, analogous to the Chandrasekhar limit for white dwarf stars. Stars more massive than the TOV limit collapse into a black hole, or possibly to a quark star. The original calculation in 1939, which neglected complications such as nuclear forces between neutrons, placed this limit at approximately 0.7 solar masses (M_{☉}). Later, more refined analyses have resulted in larger values.

Theoretical work in 1996 placed the limit at approximately 1.5 to 3.0 M_{☉}, corresponding to an original stellar mass of 15 to 20 M_{☉}; additional work in the same year gave a more precise range of 2.2 to 2.9 M_{☉}.

Data from GW170817, the first gravitational wave observation attributed to merging neutron stars (thought to have collapsed into a black hole within a few seconds after merging) placed the limit in the range of 2.01 to 2.17 M_{☉}.

In the case of a rigidly spinning neutron star, meaning that different levels in the interior of the star all rotate at the same angular velocity, the mass limit is thought to increase by up to 18–20%.

== History ==
The idea that there should be an absolute upper limit for the mass of a cold (as distinct from thermal pressure-supported) self-gravitating body dates back to the 1932 work of Lev Landau, based on the Pauli exclusion principle. Pauli's principle shows that the fermionic particles in sufficiently compressed matter would be forced into energy states so high that their rest mass contribution would become negligible when compared with the relativistic kinetic contribution (RKC). RKC is determined just by the relevant quantum wavelength λ, which would be of the order of the mean interparticle separation. In terms of Planck units, with the reduced Planck constant ħ, the speed of light c, and the gravitational constant G all set equal to one, there will be a corresponding pressure given roughly by

$P=\frac{1}{\lambda^4}$.

At the upper mass limit, that pressure will equal the pressure needed to resist gravity. The pressure to resist gravity for a body of mass M will be given according to the virial theorem roughly by

$P^3=M^2\rho^4$,

where ρ is the density. This will be given by ρ = m/λ^{3}, where m is the relevant mass per particle. It can be seen that the wavelength cancels out so that one obtains an approximate mass limit formula of the very simple form

$M=\frac{1}{m^2}$.

In this relationship, m can be taken to be given roughly by the proton mass. This even applies in the white dwarf case (that of the Chandrasekhar limit) for which the fermionic particles providing the pressure are electrons. This is because the mass density is provided by the nuclei in which the neutrons are at most about as numerous as the protons. Likewise, the protons, for charge neutrality, must be exactly as numerous as the electrons outside.

In the case of neutron stars, this limit was first worked out by J. Robert Oppenheimer and George Volkoff in 1939, using the work of Richard Chace Tolman. Oppenheimer and Volkoff assumed that the neutrons in a neutron star formed a degenerate cold Fermi gas. They thereby obtained a limiting mass of approximately 0.7 solar masses, which was less than the Chandrasekhar limit for white dwarfs.

Oppenheimer and Volkoff's paper notes that "the effect of repulsive forces, i.e., of raising the pressure for a given density above the value given by the Fermi equation of state ... could tend to prevent the collapse." And indeed, the most massive neutron star detected so far, PSR J0952–0607, is estimated to be much heavier than Oppenheimer and Volkoff's TOV limit at 2.35±0.17 M_{☉}. More realistic models of neutron stars that include baryon strong force repulsion predict a neutron star mass limit of 2.2 to 2.9 M_{☉}. The uncertainty in the value reflects the fact that the equations of state for extremely dense matter are not well known.

== Applications ==
In a star less massive than the limit, the gravitational compression is balanced by short-range repulsive neutron–neutron interactions mediated by the strong force and also by the quantum degeneracy pressure of neutrons, preventing collapse. If its mass is above the limit, the star will collapse to some denser form. It could form a black hole, or change composition and be supported in some other way (for example, by quark degeneracy pressure if it becomes a quark star). Because the properties of hypothetical, more exotic forms of degenerate matter are even more poorly known than those of neutron-degenerate matter, most astrophysicists assume, in the absence of evidence to the contrary, that a neutron star above the limit collapses directly into a black hole.

A black hole formed by the collapse of an individual star must have mass exceeding the Tolman–Oppenheimer–Volkoff limit. Theory predicts that because of mass loss during stellar evolution, a black hole formed from an isolated star of solar metallicity can have a mass of no more than approximately 10 solar masses.^{: Fig. 16} Observationally, because of their large mass, relative faintness, and X-ray spectra, several massive objects in X-ray binaries are thought to be stellar black holes. These black hole candidates are estimated to have masses between 3 and 20 solar masses. LIGO has detected black hole mergers involving black holes in the 7.5–50 solar mass range; it is possible – although unlikely – that these black holes were themselves the result of previous mergers.

Oppenheimer and Volkoff discounted the influence of heat, stating in reference to work by Landau (1932), 'even [at] 10^{7} degrees... the pressure is determined essentially by the density only and not by the temperature' – yet it has been estimated that temperatures can reach up to approximately > 10^{9} K during formation of a neutron star, mergers and binary accretion. Another source of heat and therefore collapse-resisting pressure in neutron stars is 'viscous friction in the presence of differential rotation.'

Oppenheimer and Volkoff's calculation of the mass limit of neutron stars also neglected to consider the rotation of neutron stars. We now know that neutron stars are capable of spinning at much faster rates than were known in Oppenheimer and Volkoff's time. The fastest-spinning neutron star known is PSR J1748-2446ad, rotating at a rate of 716 times per second or 43,000 revolutions per minute, giving a linear (tangential) speed at the surface on the order of 0.24c (i.e., nearly a quarter the speed of light). Star rotation interferes with convective heat loss during supernova collapse, so rotating stars are more likely to collapse directly to form a black hole.

== List of the least massive black holes ==
Name	Mass (M_{☉})	Distance (ly)	Companion class	Mass determination method	Notes	Refs.
2MASS J05215658+4359220	3.3+2.8 −0.7	10,000	K-type (?) giant	Spectroscopic radial velocity measurements of noninteracting companion.	In Milky Way outskirts. Recent Hubble ultraviolet data has suggested the companion to this object is actually a warm subgiant, and ruling out smaller compact companions such as a white dwarf.	
GW190425's remnant	3.4+0.3 −0.1	518,600,000	N/A	Gravitational wave data of neutron star merger from LIGO and Virgo interferometers.	97% chance of prompt collapse into a black hole immediately after merger. Alternative study suggests collapse 2.5 hours later.	
NGC 3201-1	4.36±0.41	15,600	(see Notes)	Spectroscopic radial velocity measurements of noninteracting companion.	In globular cluster NGC 3201. Companion is 0.8M_{☉} main sequence turn-off.	
GRO J1719-24/ GRS 1716−249	≥4.9	8,500	K0-5 V	Near-infrared photometry of companion and Eddington flux.	LMXB system.	
4U 1543-47	5.0+2.5 −2.3	30,000 ± 3,500	A2 (V)?	Spectroscopic radial velocity measurements of companion.	SXT system.	
XTE J1650-500	≥5.1	8,500 ± 2,300	K4V	Orbital resonance modeling from QPOs	Transient binary X-ray source	
GRO J1655-40	5.31±0.07	<5,500	F6IV	Precision X-ray timing observations from RossiXTE.	LMXB system.	
GX 339-4	5.9±3.6	26,000	N/A			

== List of objects in mass gap ==
This list contains objects that may be neutron stars, black holes, quark stars, or other exotic objects. This list is distinct from the list of least massive black holes due to the undetermined nature of these objects, largely because of indeterminate mass, or other poor observation data.

Name	Mass (M_{☉})	Distance (ly)	Companion class	Mass determination method	Notes	Refs.
GW170817's remnant	2.74+0.04 −0.01	144,000,000	N/A	Gravitational wave data of neutron star merger from LIGO and Virgo interferometers.	In NGC 4993. Possibly collapsed into a black hole 5–10 seconds after merger.	
SS 433	3.0–30.0	18,000 ± 700	A7Ib		First discovered microquasar system. Confirmed to have a magnetic field, which is atypical for a black hole; however, it could be the field of the accretion disk, not of the compact object.	
LB-1	2.0–70.0	approx. 7,000	Be star/stripped helium star		Initially thought to be first black hole in pair-instability mass gap.	
Cygnus X-3	2.0–5.0	24,100 ± 3,600	WN4-6	Near-infrared spectroscopy and atmosphere model fitting of companion.	Microquasar system. Major differences between the spectrum of Cyg X-3 and typical accreting BH can be explained by properties of its companion star.	
LS I +61 303	1.0–4.0	7,000	B0Ve	Spectroscopic radial velocity measurements of companion.	Microquasar system. It has a spectrum typical for black holes, however it emits HE and VHE gamma rays similar to neutron stars LS_2883 and HESS J0632+057, as well as mysterious object LS 5039.	
LS 5039	3.7+1.3 −1.0	8,200 ± 300	O(f)N6.5V	Intermediate-dispersion spectroscopy and atmosphere model fitting of companion.	Microquasar system. Only lowest possible mass allows it not to be a black hole.	
GRO J0422+32/V518 Persei	3.97+0.95 −1.87	8,500	M4.5V	Photometric light curve modelling.	SXT system. Only mass close to lowest possible allows it not to be a black hole.	

== See also ==
- Bekenstein bound
- Oppenheimer–Snyder model
- Quark star
- Tolman–Oppenheimer–Volkoff equation
