= Gamma-ray binary =

Gamma-ray binary LMC P3

Gamma-ray binaries are a class of high-mass binary star system that emits the majority of its radiation at gamma-ray wavelengths, typically in the form of non-thermal emission peaking above 1 MeV. Gamma ray binaries are made up of a massive star and a compact object. One example is LMC P3 located in the Large Magellanic Cloud.

== Properties ==
Gamma-ray binaries host a compact object and an O or Be star with a mass of roughly 10–20 solar masses (M_{☉}), a radius of approximately ten R_{☉}, and a photosphere temperature of 20000–40000K. Their orbital periods vary widely, from several days to several years.

Gamma-ray binaries can be observed across the electromagnetic spectrum—The compact object emits the bulk of electromagnetic radiation in radio, gamma rays, and X-rays, while the massive star emits most of the electromagnetic radiation in near infrared, visible light, and ultraviolet. The X-rays emitted by gamma-ray binaries lack frequent features of X-ray binaries, such as relativistic reflection. Additionally, their radio emission, consistent with synchrotron radiation, is uncommon in high-mass X-ray binaries.

== Observation and history ==
In the late 1970s, the first high-energy gamma-ray source, 2CG 135+01, was discovered; the source was found to be a binary system containing a Be star and a compact object. In the 1980s, many instruments began to detect very-high-energy gamma-rays from astronomical binaries, such as X-ray binary Cygnus X-3.

In the 2000s, the improvement in the angular resolution and sensitivity of gamma-ray detectors such as EGRET, AGILE, and Fermi allowed for gamma-ray binaries to be confidently detected and identified.

Gamma-ray binaries can be observed spectroscopically as a non-thermal gamma-ray component (from the compact object) and a thermal, lower-energy component (blackbody radiation from the normal star). Their orbital periods are generally detected by timing pulsations from the neutron star in the system, as the radial velocity method has poor accuracy since the non-compact star contains the bulk of the mass in the system.

== Theories for gamma-ray emission ==
There are several theories as to why gamma-ray binaries emit at such high energies. The prevailing idea is that the gamma-ray emission is powered by the spin-down of a rotating, strongly-magnetized (10^{11}–10^{13} G) neutron star. Another theory is that the gamma rays are emitted by a high-energy relativistic jet by an accreting microquasar. As observations of pulsations or a compact object mass estimate of 3 solar masses, which would confirm the compact object as a neutron star or black hole respectively, are elusive, astronomers must rely on indirect evidence to support these theories.

== Gamma-ray emission from other binary systems ==
Not all gamma-ray emitting binaries are gamma-ray binaries; some binaries have been detected to emit gamma rays but do not emit the majority of their electromagnetic radiation within the >1 MeV range. Examples of such binaries include microquasars, colliding wind binaries, novae, and particularly millisecond pulsars.

== Known gamma-ray binaries ==
Some known gamma-ray binaries include:

- PSR B1259-63
- LS 5039
- LS I +61 303
- HESS J0632+057
- 1FGL J1018.6–5856
- 4FGL J1405.1−6119
- HD 215227 (candidate)

== See also ==
- X-ray binary
