= Chicago Air Shower Array =

1990s astrophysics experiment in Utah

- Location(s): Utah
- Coordinates: 40°12′N 112°48′W
- Organization: University of Chicago
- Altitude: 1450 m
- Wavelength: Ultra high energy (E> 100 TeV)
- Built: 1988–1991
- Collecting area: 235,000 square-meters
- Location of Chicago Air Shower Array

The Chicago Air Shower Array (CASA) was a significant ultra high high-energy astrophysics experiment operating in the 1990s. It consisted of a very large array of scintillation detectors located at Dugway Proving Grounds in Utah, USA, approximately 80 kilometers southwest of Salt Lake City. The full CASA detector, consisting of 1089 detectors began operating in 1992 in conjunction with a second instrument, the Michigan Muon Array (MIA), under the name CASA-MIA. MIA was made of 2500 square meters of buried muon detectors. At the time of its operation, CASA-MIA was the most sensitive experiment built to date in the study of gamma ray and cosmic ray interactions at energies above 100 TeV (10^{14} electronvolts). Research topics on data from this experiment covered a wide variety of physics issues, including the search for gamma rays from Galactic sources (especially the Crab Nebula and the X-ray binaries Cygnus X-3 and Hercules X-1) and extragalactic sources (active Galactic nuclei and gamma-ray bursts), the study of diffuse gamma-ray emission (an isotropic component or from the Galactic plane), and measurements of the cosmic ray composition in the region from 100 to 100,000 TeV. For the topic of composition, CASA-MIA worked in conjunction with several other experiments at the same site: the Broad Laterial Non-imaging Cherenkov Array (BLANCA), the Dual Imaging Cherenkov Experiment (DICE) and the Fly's Eye HiRes prototype experiment. CASA-MIA operated continuously between 1992 and 1999. In summer 1999, it was decommissioned.

== Specifications and design ==
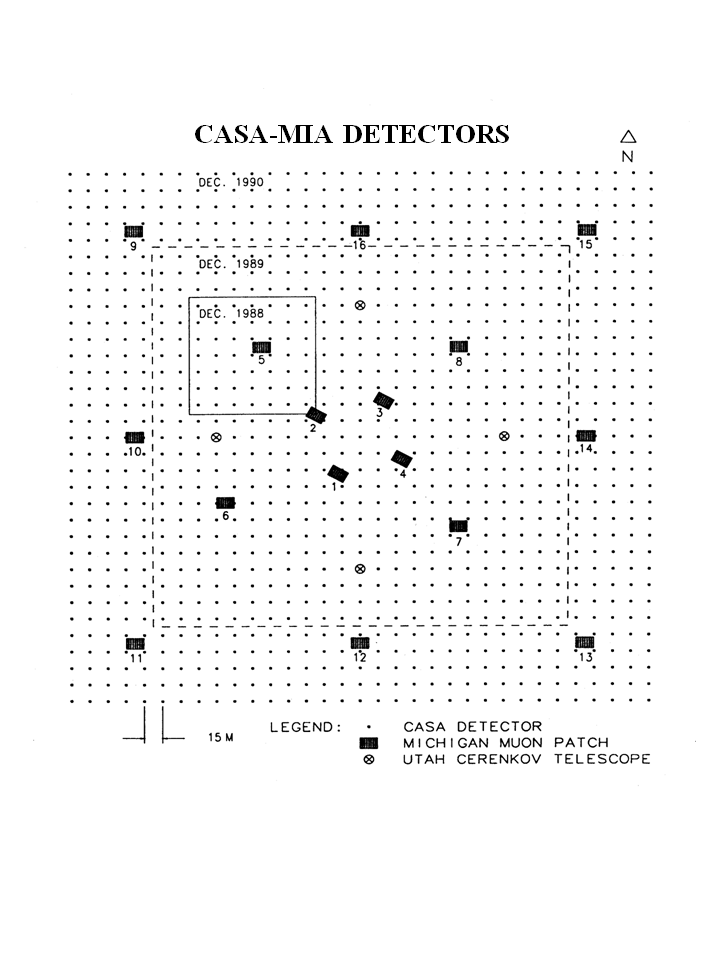
Plan view of the CASA-MIA detectors at Dugway Proving Grounds in Utah, USA. CASA consisted of 1089 scintillation detectors on a square 15 m × 15 m grid. MIA consisted of 1024 scintillation counters arranged in 16 patches. Five small Cherenkov telescopes were co-located at the site and used for angular alignment.

CASA was built to study the possibility of astrophysical sources of ultra high energy (UHE, E > 100 TeV) gamma-ray emission (see Science below). Gamma rays at these energies interact in the Earth's atmosphere to create an extensive air shower that propagates to the Earth's surface. At the surface, the shower consists predominantly of electrons/positrons, low-energy gamma rays, muons, and some hadrons, with a typical footprint on the ground of 50–100 m. (There is also a component of Cherenkov radiation reaching the ground that can be recorded by imaging atmospheric Cherenkov telescopes). An air shower array is a distributed set of particle detectors (scintillation detector, water Cherenkov detectors, etc.) spread out on the ground to record the passage of the shower particles. The primary particle direction is estimated from the relative arrival time of the shower hitting each detector; the primary particle energy is estimated from the number of particles recorded in each detector and from the lateral distribution of those measurements.

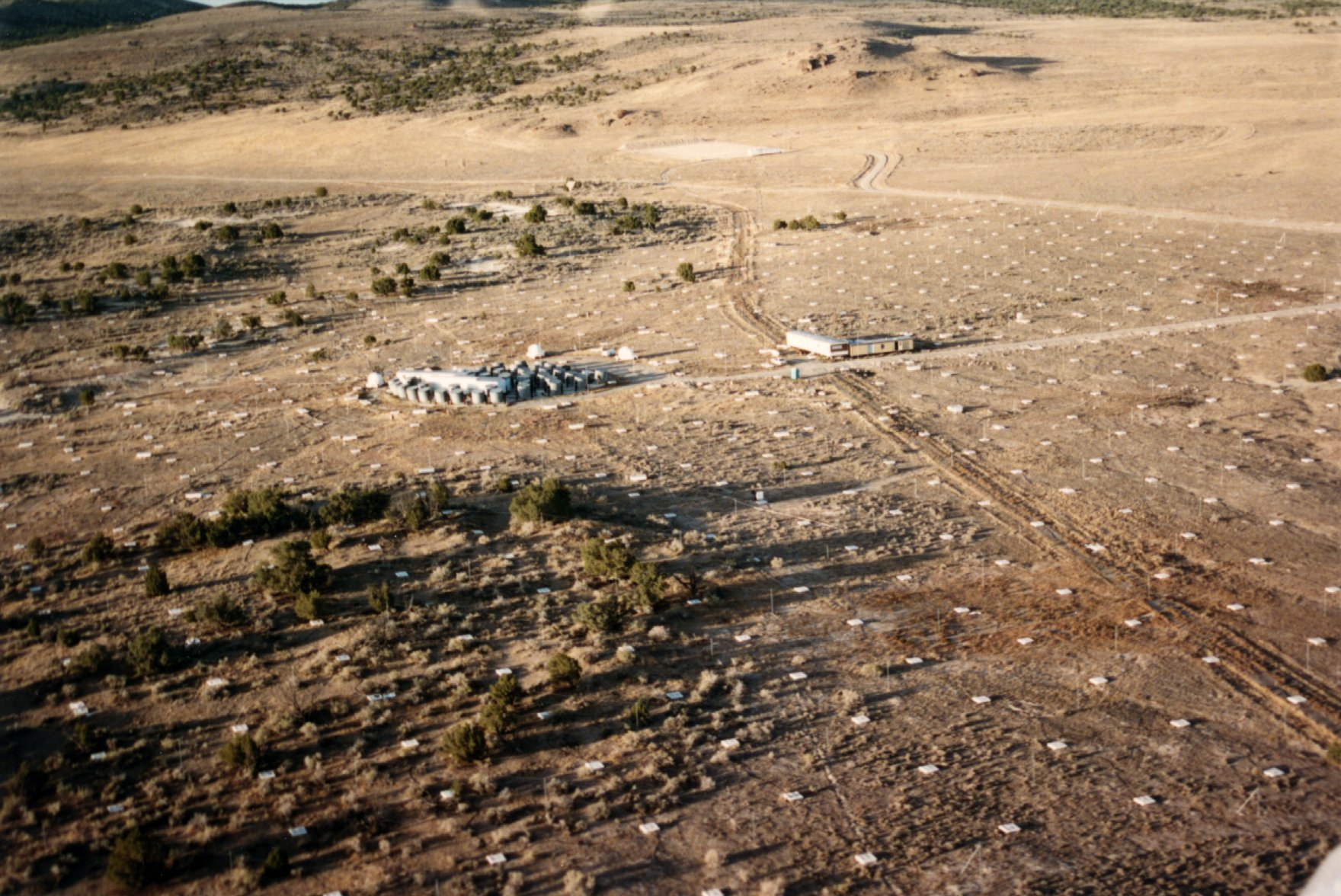
Aerial view of the Chicago Air Shower Array (CASA) and associated detectors at Dugway Proving Grounds, Utah, USA. The CASA scintillation detectors are the white square boxes laid out on a 15-meter grid spacing. At the center of the array (left of center in this image) is the Fly's Eye II detector.

Prior to CASA, air shower arrays were typically modest in size, typically consisting of 50-100 detectors covering an area of around 50,000 square meters. The plan for CASA was to build a much more sensitive experiment that would be much larger in size, use state-of-the-art electronics, and be coupled with a large array of muon detectors (MIA). The expectation was that showers initiated by gamma rays would contain far fewer muons compared to showers initiated by cosmic rays. The original plan was for an array of 1064 detectors, but the number was subsequently increased to 1089.

Some of the key design features CASA-MIA were the following:

- 1089 scintillation detectors, spread out on a square grid of 33 × 33 detectors, with a detector spacing of 15 m, covering a total area of 230,000 square meters.
- A CASA detector consisted of four separate scintillation counters; each counter consisted of a piece of acrylic scintillator 61 cm × 61 cm × 1.27 cm in size and read out by a single photomultiplier tube (PMT, either Amperex 2212 or EMI 9256).
- Each CASA detector contained a local high voltage module and a custom-made electronics board that allowed each detector to take data independently of other detectors.
- The CASA detectors were connected to a central controller via a rib-spine network consisting of coaxial cables with three functions: trigger request, trigger acknowledge and Ethernet.
- The muon array (MIA) consisted of 1024 scintillation counters, each of size 1.9 m × 1.3 m. The muon counters were arranged in 16 patches of 64 counters each and were buried beneath 3 m below the surface. Signals from the MIA counters were run under the ground to a central trailer where relative arrival times were measured by conventional LeCroy 4290 time-to-digital converters (TDCs).

The trigger and data-acquisition sequence for CASA was complex because of the distributed electronics; it worked as follows:

- The PMT signals in each counter are each sampled by a low-level and high-level discriminator. The low discriminator level is set to around 0.1 of the signal from a typical minimum-ionizing particle; the high discriminator level is set to around three times that of the low level.
- A detector with two or more counters firing the high-level discriminator in 30 nsec is "alerted"; a detector with three or more counters firing the high-level discriminator if 30 nsec is "triggered.
- Alerted stations carry out local data acquisition tasks and inhibit further triggering of the station. Time-to-voltage converters on the local electronics board hold the four relative times of the four counters in a detector (determined by the crossing time of the low-level discriminator) and four times corresponding to the times of arrival of pulses sent by the neighboring four detectors, if they have been alerted. Sample and hold circuits record the four charges corresponding to the integrals of the PMT signals from each counter. Alerted stations wait for 10 μsecs for a trigger acknowledge signal from the central station; if no signal is received, their data are discarded.
- Triggered stations place a fast current pulse (5 mA, 10 μsec duration) onto the rib trigger request coaxial cable (RG-58, 50Ω); these signals are propagated to a central trigger box via a repeater at the rib/spine junction and a spine trigger request coaxial cable (RG-8, 50Ω).
- The entire array is triggered when three trigger request levels are received by the central trigger box. Then, a fast signal (12V, μsec duration) is placed on the trigger acknowledge coaxial line where it is propagated back to each station via the rib-spine network. Upon receipt of a trigger acknowledge signal, alerted stations digitize their eight times and four charges through a multiplexer and a 10-bit analog-to-digital converter (ADC). The digitized data are stored in a memory buffer under the control of a microprocessor (Intel 80186). The dominant deadtime for the array is when data are digitized (approximately 0.5 msec).
- Periodically (typically every 30 sec), the station electronic boards receive a command over Ethernet to transmit their data to a central computer (DEC μVAX III+). Each board switches their memory buffer and continues to accumulate data; the previous recorded data are transmitted over the rib-spine network to the center where they are recorded on disk.

CASA, and its associated muon array MIA, achieved excellent performance and was the state-of-the-art in air shower experiments in the ultra high energy band for a considerable period of time after its operational period in the 1990s. Only in the late 2010s have experiments such as the Tibet Air Shower Array and the High Altitude Water Cherenkov Experiment surpassed CASA-MIA in sensitivity at energies above 100 TeV. The median gamma-ray energy for a source passing near zenith was 115 TeV. The gamma-ray angular resolution varied with the size (number of particles) in the detected shower and was approximately 0.7 degrees for showers with the median number of particles, improving to 0.25 degrees at higher energies. The muon array provided important capability to reject background cosmic ray events; at the median energy of 115 TeV, the fraction of cosmic ray events passing the muon selection criteria for gamma rays was 0.06 (i.e. approximately 17 cosmic ray events were rejected for each one accepted). At higher energies, the background rejection power was significantly increased; for example, at a median energy of 5,000 TeV, the fraction of cosmic rays passing muon selection criteria was reduced to approximately 0.0001.

== History ==
The scientific motivation for CASA came from intriguing results from several experiments in the 1980s. These experiments reported excess air shower events from the direction of two well-known Galactic X-ray binary sources: Cygnus X-3 and Hercules X-1. In 1983, the Kiel and Haverah Park experiments reported an excess of events from the direction of Cygnus X-3, where the arrival times of the events appeared to be modulated by the 4.8-hour orbital periodicity of the binary source. The statistical significance of each signal was weak (around four standard deviations above background), but the results implied that Cygnus X-3 was a luminous emitter of ultra high energy gamma rays and that, in order to do so, it must be a very efficient accelerator of high energy cosmic rays and hence it could provide a large fraction of the pervading flux of cosmic ray particles in our Galaxy.

After these results, a number of groups around the world began designing, or improving, air shower arrays to make follow-up studies. One of these groups was from the University of Chicago, led by James Cronin. Cronin's idea was to build a definitive experiment that could easily verify, or refute, the results on Cygnus X-3. The experiment would be much larger (and much more sensitive) than the Kiel or Haverah Park experiments and it would use a large array of muon detectors to reject the background of hadronic cosmic ray events (i.e. protons and nuclei). (Showers initiated by gamma-ray primaries are expected to have far fewer muons than those initiated by cosmic ray primaries). Cronin assembled a team of scientists (discussed in Collaboration) to develop and construct CASA. The University of Chicago group was partnered with groups from the University of Michigan and the University of Utah, who had already constructed a muon array and smaller air shower array, and the site for CASA would be on Dugway Proving Grounds.

The construction and deployment of CASA took place between 1988 and 1991. Construction activities were carried out at the University of Chicago in the Accelerator Building of the Enrico Fermi Institute. The completed scintillation detectors, along with electronics, were shipped to Utah in large semi-trailers, where they were installed by students, postdocs and faculty. An initial array of 49 detectors became operational in 1989, followed by a 529-detector array in 1990. Standard science operation of the full 1089-detector CASA array (along with the 1024-counter muon array) started in December 1991. CASA operated very successfully, largely without interruption, until 1997. During that time a total of approximately 3 billion air showers events were recorded. Partial operations continued for several more years, in conjunction with the BLANCA and DICE experiments. The various experiments at the site, including CASA, ceased operation in 1999.

== Science ==
The scientific results from CASA-MIA encompassed a dozen scientific publications and covered topics in three broad areas of high-energy astrophysics: gamma-ray point sources, diffuse gamma-ray sources, and cosmic ray physics.

- Gamma-ray point sources: CASA-MIA set stringent limits on the emission from all sources that had been reported by earlier experiments, including Cygnus X-3 and Hercules X-1, the Crab Nebula, and known high-energy active galactic nuclei. For these sources, the CASA-MIA limits were typically two to three orders of magnitude lower than the flux levels reported by the previous instruments. Searches were also made for transient and period emission from point sources and a general survey of the overhead sky was also carried out.
- Diffuse gamma-ray sources: the rejection power of the large muon array allowed CASA-MIA to study diffuse gamma-ray sources with great sensitivity. The most significant result came from a search of diffuse isotropic emission, which provided a limit on the electromagnetic fraction of the cosmic rays at a level less than 2 × 10^{−5} at the highest energies. Another significant result came from a study of diffuse emission from the Galactic plane. A separate study searched for bursts from arbitrary directions in the sky to constrain short timescale cosmic events, such as the explosions of primordial black holes.
- Cosmic ray physics: with its large and uniform air shower array, couple with a large muon detector, CASA-MIA had good capability to making measurements of the properties of the ultra high energy cosmic rays. The electron and muon shower size distributions (determined from CASA and MIA, respectively) were used to measure the cosmic ray energy spectrum between 100 and 10,000 TeV. The CASA-MIA results showed a smooth steepening of the spectrum, in contrast with some earlier experiments that reported a sharper feature (known as the "knee"). CASA-MIA measurements of the cosmic ray composition were made from a combined fit to the surface and muon detector data and indicated a mixed composition at lower energies (below 1,000 TeV) that evolved smoothly to a heavier composition at energies approaching 10,000 TeV. A separate, and complementary, measurement of the cosmic ray composition was made by the BLANCA instrument that operated in conjunction with CASA-MIA and used the lateral distribution of the Cherenkov radiation in air showers.

== Scientific collaborations ==
The CASA project was conceived by James W. Cronin and the design and construction were carried out by a team of scientists, engineers and technicians in the Enrico Fermi Institute of the University of Chicago (see for more details). The initial core group of scientists consisted of Cronin, postdoctoral fellows Kenneth Gibbs, Brian Newport, Rene Ong, and Leslie Rosenberg, and graduate students Nicholas Mascarenhas, Hans Krimm and Timothy McKay. During the operational phase of CASA, the Chicago group included postdoctoral fellows Mark Chantell, Corbin Covault, Brian Fick and Lucy Fortson, Kevin Green, and graduate students Alexandre Borione, Joseph Fowler and Scott Oser. The Michigan Muon Array was constructed by a team of researchers from the University of Michigan, including James Matthews, David Nitz, Daniel Sinclair, and John van der Velde, post-doc Kevin Green, and graduate students Mike Catanese and Ande Kennedy Glasmacher.

== See also ==
- Large High Altitude Air Shower Observatory
