= IRAS 18293−0941 =

X-ray binary in the constellation Scutum

- Artists impression of the microblazar (centre) creating two powerful jets, one directed at Earth (left) and the other hitting a molecular interstellar cloud (right).

Observation data Epoch J2000 Equinox ICRS
- Constellation: Scutum
- Right ascension: 18^{h} 32^{m} 08.9340^{s}
- Declination: −09° 39′ 06.044″

Characteristics
- Evolutionary stage: Stellar black hole + blue giant/supergiant
- Spectral type: Be?
- Apparent magnitude (I): 12.3
- Variable type: HMXB

Astrometry
Proper motion (μ)	RA: -2.158 mas/yr Dec.: −3.653 mas/yr
Parallax (π)	0.0709±0.2255 mas
Distance	11,742 ly (3,600 pc)

Orbit
Period (P)	11.38±0.01 d
Eccentricity (e)	0
Inclination (i)	20°

Details

Donor star
Radius	27 R_{☉}
Temperature	45,000 K

Black Hole
Mass	10 M_{☉}
Age	50,000 years

Other designations
- TIC 216181169, 2MASS J18320893-0939058, Gaia DR3 4155880659943846016

Database references
SIMBAD	data

IRAS 18293−0941 is a high-mass X-ray binary (HMXB) system consisting of a stellar-mass black hole accreting matter from a blue giant or supergiant of spectral type O/B, located at a distance of 3.6 kpc from Earth in the constellation Scutum. IRAS 18293−0941 is the first discovered microblazar.

== Discovery history ==
The object was first registered in 1983 by the Infrared Astronomical Satellite (IRAS) and cataloged as a point-like infrared source. Due to its location in the plane of the Milky Way and the high level of interstellar extinction, detailed study of the system was impossible for several decades.

Interest in the source was renewed following the analysis of data from large-scale centimeter-wave radio surveys, in particular MAGPIS, CORNISH, and VLASS. Astronomers detected a persistent spatial asymmetry: the object had a bright compact core, while continuous radio emission was observed only on one side of it. Such morphology indicated the presence of a relativistic jet subject to the effect of one-sided Doppler boosting.

In September 2026, an international team of researchers led by Josep Martí and Pedro L. Luque Escamilla from the University of Jaén, with participation from specialists at the University of Amsterdam, National University of La Plata, IAR, University of Barcelona, IAC and Fabra Observatory published the results of a coordinated multiwavelength observational campaign in the scientific journal Astronomy & Astrophysics. Using the EVN and VLA radio interferometers, the MeerKAT telescope, as well as infrared spectrometers and X-ray observatories, the scientists confirmed the physical nature of the system and officially classified IRAS 18293−0941 as a microblazar.

== Physical characteristics ==
IRAS 18293−0941 is classified as a high-mass X-ray binary system and consists of a stellar-mass black hole and a donor star. The mass of the compact object is 10 M☉. Its age was estimated at 5×10^{4} years, or approximately 50,000 years. The companion star is a massive hot early-type O/B star, whose optical radiation undergoes strong absorption in a dense circumbinary dust and gas envelope. Its radius is estimated to be 27 R☉, and its temperature is about 45,000 K. Both objects orbit their common center of mass with an orbital period of 11.38 days.

Mass transfer from the donor star forms a geometrically thick accretion disk. The process occurs at a near- or super-Eddington accretion rate, initiating the generation of an intense disk wind and collimated jets of relativistic plasma with an ejection velocity of about 0.75 times the speed of light.

== Interaction with the interstellar medium ==
Jet–environment interaction in IRAS 18293−0941 on multiple spatial scales.

The long-term hydrodynamic impact of a hidden relativistic jet has been verified using data from the highly sensitive MeerKAT radio telescope. The western jet has formed an extended cavitation cavity in the interstellar gas approximately 100 light-years in length, equivalent to 30 parsecs. At the cavitation boundary, where the relativistic flow collides with a dense molecular cloud, an unstructured "hotspot" with a non-thermal synchrotron radiation mechanism is localized.

The shock front in the hot spot region acts as a natural accelerator of charged particles, boosting protons to energies on the order of 10^{15} eV. The interaction of these hadrons with the molecular cloud material produces ultra-high-energy gamma radiation through the decay of neutral pions. This region spatially coincides with the hard gamma-ray source LHAASO J1831−1007u*.

== See also ==
- High-mass X-ray binary (HMXB)
- Stellar black hole
- OB star
