= Reshmi Mukherjee =

Indian-American astrophysicist

Reshmi Mukherjee is an Indian-American astrophysicist known for her research on gamma-ray astronomy and blazars, involving work based on the Compton Gamma Ray Observatory, VERITAS, Energetic Gamma Ray Experiment Telescope (EGRET), and Cherenkov Telescope Array collaborations. She is Helen Goodhart Altschul Professor of Physics & Astronomy at Barnard College.

== Education and career ==
Mukherjee writes that she was inspired to go into physics by her father, who encouraged her in it despite his own lack of a college education. She graduated with a bachelor's degree in physics from Presidency College, at the time part of the University of Calcutta, in 1986, and earned a master's degree there in 1989. She went to Columbia University for graduate study, under the supervision of Elena Aprile, and completed her Ph.D. in physics at Columbia in 1993.

After postdoctoral research with the EGRET project at the NASA Goddard Space Flight Center, and a visiting position at McGill University, she joined the Barnard faculty in 1997.

Mukherjee's teaching includes introducing undergraduates to research by bringing them on visits to the ground-based observatories she works with and by including them in the analysis of data from the observatories. As a faculty member at Barnard, she also teaches physics at Columbia University.

== Recognition ==
Mukherjee was named a Fellow of the American Physical Society (APS) in 2017, after a nomination from the APS Division of Astrophysics, "for advancing multifrequency strategies for the identification of gamma-ray sources and contributing significant leadership in blazar studies between the GeV and TeV gamma-ray bands".
