= LS I +61 303 =

Star in the constellation Cassiopeia

Observation data Epoch J2000 Equinox ICRS
- Constellation: Cassiopeia
- Right ascension: 02^{h} 40^{m} 31.6644^{s}
- Declination: +61° 13′ 45.594″
- Apparent magnitude (V): 10.61–10.83

Characteristics
- Evolutionary stage: main sequence + pulsar
- Spectral type: B0Ve
- U−B color index: −0.34
- B−V color index: +0.86
- Variable type: High-mass X-ray binary

Astrometry
Radial velocity (R_{v})	+392.1 km/s
Proper motion (μ)	RA: −0.423 mas/yr Dec.: −0.256 mas/yr
Parallax (π)	0.3776±0.0130 mas
Distance	8,600 ± 300 ly (2,650 ± 90 pc)

Details

Be star
Mass	14.6 M_{☉}
Radius	6.9 R_{☉}
Luminosity	50,000 L_{☉}
Surface gravity (log g)	3.38 cgs
Temperature	22,500 K

Other designations
- V615 Cas, 1RXS J024033.5+611358, TYC 4047-1917-1, HIP 12469

Database references
SIMBAD	data

LS I +61 303 is a binary system containing a massive star and a compact object. The compact object is a pulsar and the system is around 7,000 light-years away.

== Discovery ==
LS I +61 303 is an 11th-magnitude star that was recognised as a luminous object and catalogued as an OB star in 1959. It was included in the Hipparcos survey as HIP 12469 and had its parallax measured at 5.65±2.28 milliarcseconds (mas), revised to −0.29±2.99 mas in the new reduction. The third Gaia data release gave a parallax of 0.38±0.01 mas.

The Galactic radio source GT 0236+610 was found at the same position as LS I +61 303. A gamma-ray source 2CG 135+01 was found within a degree of its position, and the MAGIC telescope confirmed that LS I +61 303 was the source of the gamma rays. Periodic X-ray outbursts also occur.

== Binary system ==
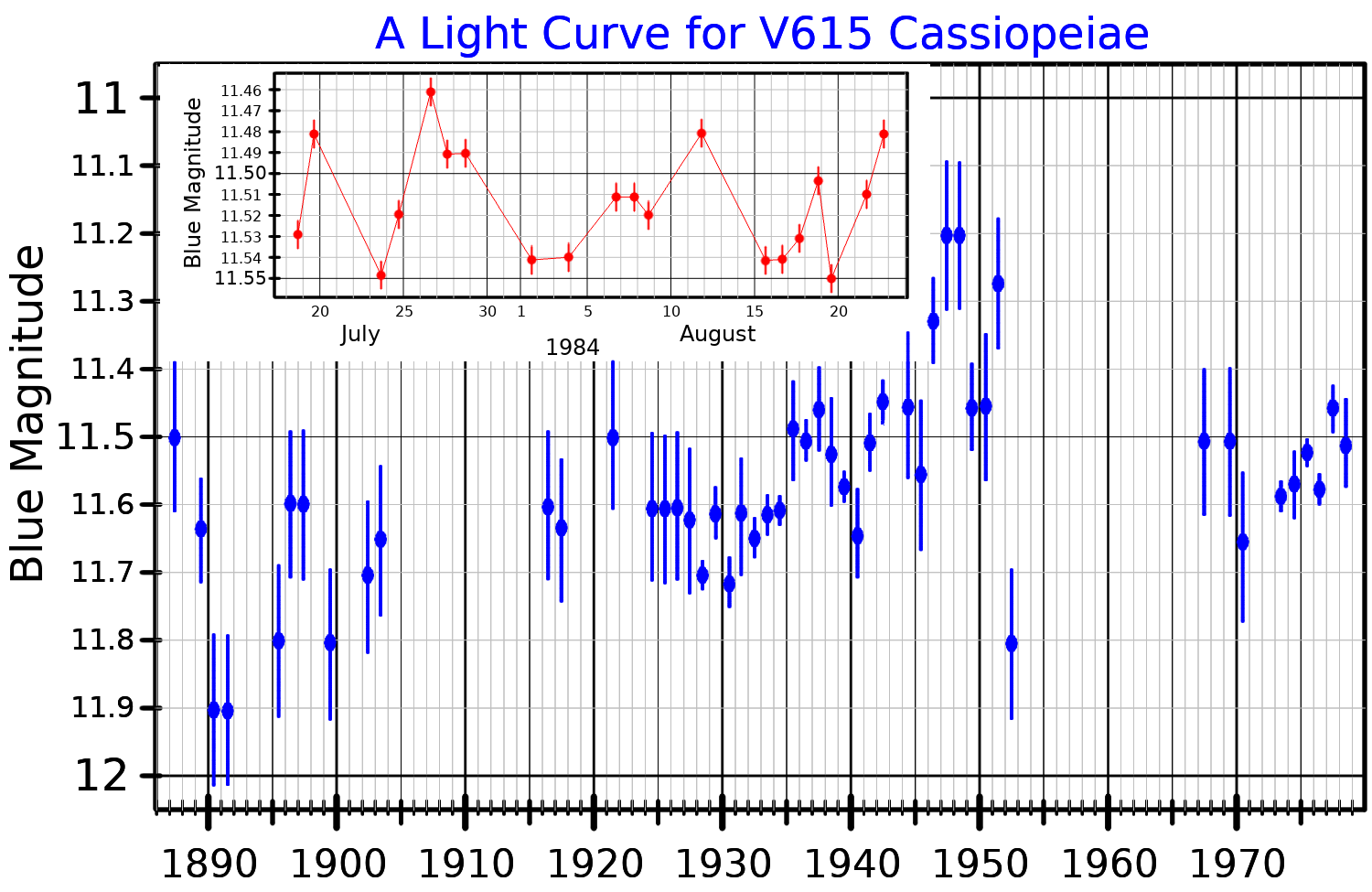
A blue band light curve for V615 Cassiopeiae. The main plot shows the long-term variability derived from 359 photographic plates. The inset plot shows the short-term variability. Adapted from Gregory et al. (1979) and Lipunova (1988)

LS I +61 303 shows the spectrum of a Be star, a B0 main sequence star with disk that produces emission lines in its spectrum. Variations in its radial velocity show that it is in orbit with an unseen compact object having a mass between 1 and 4 M_{☉}. The pair orbit every 26.496 days. Although the uncertain mass of the compact object would allow it to be a neutron star, it was often suggested to be a black hole. In March 2022, a period of ~0.27 s was reported to be detected in observations using the FAST telescope, confirming the neutron star nature of the compact object. This promotes the possibility that the system is indeed the first one detected containing a pulsar with magnetar behavior in it.

== Variability ==
In 1979, Philip C. Gregory et al. discovered that the star's brightness varies, after examining decades of Harvard College Observatory photographic plates. LS I +61 303 varies slightly at optical wavelengths, but measurements going back to 1887 show no obvious period. It also shows regular X-ray outbursts coinciding with its orbital period, and strong radio variability. It was given the variable star designation V615 Cassiopeiae.

== Microquasar ==
LS I +61 303 emits HE and VHE (High Energy and Very High Energy) gamma rays. It is only one of several known star systems that produce such energetic rays. Other such systems are PSR B1259–63, LS 5039 and HESS J0632+057.
