= PeVatron =

Ultra-high-energy cosmic ray source

A PeVatron is a astronomical object capable of producing extremely high-energy cosmic rays. Specifically, these objects can accelerate hadrons to energies reaching petaelectronvolt (PeV) scale (10^{15} eV). This energy level is more than 100 times greater than that achieved by the Large Hadron Collider.

Identifying the locations and mechanisms of PeVatrons is an open question in high-energy astronomy, as they represent the most powerful natural particle accelerators in the Milky Way. Several classes of objects have been identified as potential PeVatrons, including supermassive black holes, supernova remnants (SNRs), star-forming regions, and pulsars.

== Background ==
The search for PeVatrons is driven by the observation of the cosmic ray spectrum. Astrophysicists have observed a cutoff in the cosmic ray spectrum, commonly referred to as the "knee", where the number of cosmic rays hitting Earth begins to drop off sharply at approximately 4 PeV. This is theorized to be due to the confinement limit of galactic magnetic fields or the maximum energy that galactic accelerators can produce.

PeVatrons are thought to accelerate particles through diffusive shock acceleration, where particles from a blast wave bounce back and forth across the shock front, gaining energy upon each collision.

Because cosmic rays are charged, they are deflected by magnetic fields, making it impossible to trace them back to their origin. However, astronomers can look for gamma rays and neutrinos produced by PeV-scale electrons that collide with interstellar gas, known as "air showers". The search for PeVatrons has been accelerated by ground-based observatories capable of detecting these air showers in Earth's atmosphere. In 2021, the Large High Altitude Air Shower Observatory (LHAASO) in China discovered 12 PeVatron candidates within the Milky Way. A photon from the Cygnus region was detected at 1.4 PeV, the highest energy photon ever recorded at the time. In 2026, Cygnus X-3, an X-ray binary system, was found to have produced two photons with energies over 3 PeV, leading to its classification as a "super PeVatron". The High Energy Stereoscopic System (H.E.S.S.), a Cherenkov telescope, mapped the Galactic Center and provided evidence that the supermassive black hole at Milky Way's core, Sagittarius A*, acted as a PeVatron for thousands of years.
