= Lucy Fortson =

American astronomer

Lucy Frear Fortson is an American astronomer known for her work on gamma-ray astronomy and Galaxy morphological classification and for her leadership of citizen science projects including the Galaxy Zoo and Zooniverse. She is a professor in the School of Physics and Astronomy at the University of Minnesota.

== Education and career ==
Fortson graduated from Smith College in 1984, majoring in physics and astronomy. She spent a year working at the Space Telescope Science Institute before returning to graduate study at the University of California, Los Angeles, where she completed a Ph.D. in 1991; her doctoral work in high energy physics involved experiments at CERN, in Geneva.

After postdoctoral research on cosmic rays and gamma-ray astronomy at the University of Chicago, associated with the VERITAS observatory, she joined the astronomy faculty at the Adler Planetarium in Chicago in 1997. She worked at the planetarium for 13 years, eventually becoming a vice president there and holding an affiliation as research scientist at the University of Chicago, before moving to her present position at the University of Minnesota. She is co-founder of the Zooniverse, a citizen science project that allows the public to contribute to real research problems in a variety of topics, including astronomy and astrophysics.

== Recognition ==
The American Physical Society (APS) gave Fortson their 2019 Dwight Nicholson Medal for Outreach. She was named a Fellow of the American Physical Society in 2020, after a nomination from the APS Division of Astrophysics, "for groundbreaking innovations to public engagement in astrophysics research, and for the fundamental advancement of understanding active galactic nuclei through leadership in high energy gamma ray astronomy." The University of Minnesota gave her their 2020 George W. Taylor Award for Distinguished Service, in recognition of "her long-standing efforts in engaging the public in the process of research through the Zooniverse citizen science platform".
