= Rene Ong =

American astrophysicist

- Born: Rene Ashwin Ong
- Education: University of Michigan; Stanford University
- Scientific career
- Fields: High-energy astrophysics; Astroparticle physics; Particle physics
- Workplaces: Enrico Fermi Institute; University of Chicago; University of California, Los Angeles
- Doctoral advisor: John A. Jaros

Rene Ashwin Ong is an American astrophysicist known for his work in experimental high-energy astrophysics, astroparticle physics, and particle physics. He is a professor at the University of California, Los Angeles.

== Education ==
Ong graduated from the University of Michigan in 1981 and obtained his Ph.D. from Stanford University in 1987. He was a Robert R. McCormick Fellow at the Enrico Fermi Institute from 1988 to 1991, before becoming an assistant professor at the University of Chicago.

== Career ==
Ong's early research focused on electron–positron annihilation at SLAC PEP, including development of the first vertex drift chamber for a collider experiment with Martin Perl, followed by his doctoral work on the B hadron lifetime.

His research interests shifted to gamma-ray astronomy in 1990 after joining the Chicago Air Shower Array experiment, with the encouragement of James Cronin. He has since continued research in astrophysics with involvement in STACEE, the Fermi Gamma-ray Space Telescope, VERITAS, GAPS, and the Cherenkov Telescope Array Observatory (CTAO). As principal investigator of STACEE, he demonstrated the use of solar reflectors for high-energy astronomical observations. He was the spokesperson of VERITAS and later co-spokesperson of CTAO from 2014 until 2024, where he guided the consortium's science and construction plans. As a principal investigator of GAPS, he led the time-of-flight and triggering system development.

== Awards and recognitions ==
In 2003, he was elected a Fellow of the American Physical Society "for his contribution to high energy particle astrophysics, in particular his contribution to very high energy gamma ray astronomy, where his research has spanned four decades of the electromagnetic spectrum."
