= Ultra-high-energy gamma ray =

Gamma rays with photon energies higher than 100 TeV

Ultra-high-energy gamma rays are gamma rays with photon energies higher than 100 TeV (0.1 PeV). They have a frequency higher than 2.42 × 10^{28} Hz and a wavelength shorter than 1.24 × 10^{−20} m. The existence of these rays was confirmed in 2019. In a 18 May 2021 press release, China's Large High Altitude Air Shower Observatory (LHAASO) reported the detection of a dozen ultra-high-energy gamma rays with energies exceeding 1 peta-electron-volt (quadrillion electron-volts or PeV), including one at 1.4 PeV. The authors of the report have named the sources of these PeV gamma rays PeVatrons. In 2024, LHAASO announced the detection of a 2.5 PeV gamma ray originating from the Cygnus X region, the highest energy photon ever observed.

== Importance ==
Ultra-high-energy gamma rays are of importance because they may reveal the source of cosmic rays. Discounting the relatively weak effect of gravity, they travel in a straight line from their source to an observer. This is unlike cosmic rays which have their direction of travel scrambled by magnetic fields. Sources that produce cosmic rays will almost certainly produce gamma rays as well, as the cosmic ray particles interact with nuclei or electrons to produce photons or neutral pions which in turn decay to ultra-high-energy photons.

The ratio of primary cosmic ray hadrons to gamma rays also gives a clue as to the origin of cosmic rays. Although gamma rays could be produced near the source of cosmic rays, they could also be produced by interaction with cosmic microwave background by way of the Greisen–Zatsepin–Kuzmin limit cutoff above 50 EeV.

Ultra-high-energy gamma rays interact with magnetic fields to produce positron-electron pairs. In the Earth's magnetic field, a 10^{21} eV photon is expected to interact about 5000 km above the Earth's surface. The high-energy particles then go on to produce more lower-energy photons that can suffer the same fate. This effect creates a beam of several 10^{17} eV gamma ray photons heading in the same direction as the original UHE photon. This beam is less than 0.1 m wide when it strikes the atmosphere. These gamma rays are too low-energy to show the Landau–Pomeranchuk–Migdal effect. Only magnetic field perpendicular to the path of the photon causes pair production, so that photons coming in parallel to the geomagnetic field lines can survive intact until they meet the atmosphere. These photons coming through the magnetic window can produce Landau–Pomeranchuk–Migdal showers.
