= High-mass X-ray binary =

Type of binary star

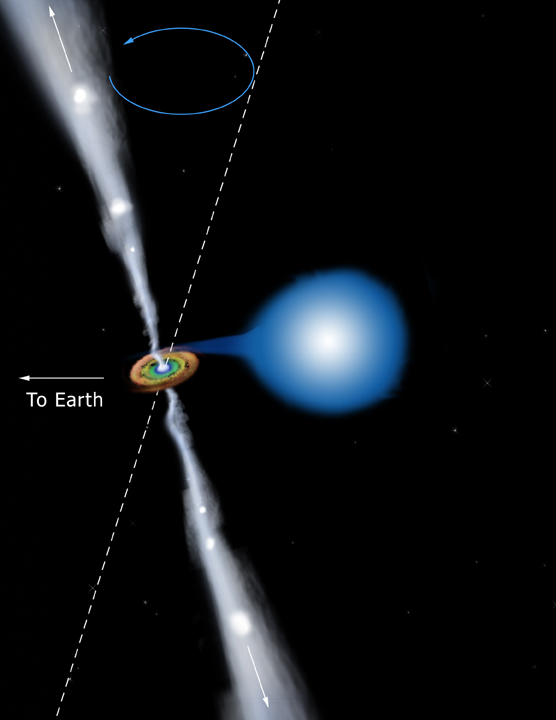
Artist's impression of a black hole HMXB with an accretion disk and jets

A high-mass X-ray binary (HMXB or HMXRB) is a binary star system containing a compact object (typically a black hole or neutron star) and a normal star more massive than approximately 8–10 solar masses (M_{☉}). They form when the more massive star in a binary undergoes a supernova explosion to become a neutron star or black hole, and then begins to accrete from the other star, which can be a supergiant, a Be star, or, rarely, a Wolf–Rayet star. The compact object, which is almost always a neutron star, usually accretes from the companion's strong stellar winds, releasing bright X-ray emission that can be observed by astronomers. This period ends when the companion begins to evolve and the binary either spirals in, forming a Thorne–Żytkow object, or becomes a double compact object binary system after the companion star explodes in a supernova.

There are several different types of HMXBs, all with different properties, modes of formation, and likely fates. Supergiant X-ray binaries, Be/X-ray binaries, and Wolf–Rayet X-ray binaries are systems containing a supergiant star, Be star, or Wolf–Rayet star respectively. X-ray pulsars contain strongly magnetized neutron stars that funnel accreted plasma onto their magnetic poles. Ultraluminous X-ray sources are HMXBs containing a compact object, likely a black hole, accreting faster than the Eddington limit. Finally, gamma-ray binaries are HMXBs that emit mostly in gamma-ray wavelengths due to interactions between their host pulsar's fast rotation and strong magnetic field. Recent launches of X-ray telescopes and studies of their data have allowed for the detection, identification, and analysis of many new HMXBs within every class.

== Formation ==
HMXBs start as binaries of two massive stars. When the more massive star begins to evolve, mass transfer begins, causing the binary's orbital period to shrink. About 4–40 million years after the binary forms, the more massive star explodes in a supernova and becomes a black hole (BH) or neutron star (NS), and the system becomes an HMXB. A supernova kick is believed to send HMXBs away from the Galactic Center; this is corroborated by observations of a larger scale height for HMXBs compared to other star types.

Formation of HMXBs varies. Some HXMBs undergo an initial phase of Roche lobe overflow when the more massive star in the binary begins to evolve, eventually forming a common envelope around both stars. Due to drag, the two stars will spiral in towards each other and ultimately eject the common envelope, leaving behind a binary with a much shorter period. Eventually, the more massive star will supernova, and the system will become an HMXB. Alternatively, an HMXB may be formed by stable, nonconservative mass transfer that can either increase or decrease the binary's orbital period. SgXBs are believed to generally form via the former method, and BeXBs the latter.

== Properties ==
Although the compact object can be either a black hole or a neutron star, in the vast majority of HMXBs with known compact-object classifications, it is a neutron star. When BHs are present in HMXBs, they tend to be more massive than the BHs in low-mass X-ray binaries (LMXBs). Donor objects tend to be O-, B-, or Be-type stars.

HMXBs generally have a positive correlation between orbital period and orbital eccentricity. More eccentric systems tend to have greater ranges of luminosity, since the amount of stellar wind they are receiving is continuously fluctuating throughout their orbit. They are brightest in UV-optical and X-ray luminosities, with luminosities of about 10^{36}–10^{38} erg/s in both spectral bands. Some HMXBs also produce significant emission in gamma rays or radio waves; emission in these wavelengths is associated with relativistic jets.

HMXBs tend to be located in the arms of spiral galaxies and in regions of young stars and rapid star formation. The number of HMXBs in a galaxy is directly proportional with its star-formation rate. Very few HMXBs are located in older star clusters, as both stars in an HMXB will have evolved into compact objects within a few hundred million years of their formation. However, HMXBs are scarce in clusters with very young stars, as the more massive stars in these binaries will not have time to evolve into compact objects.

== Dynamics ==
Unlike LMXBs and cataclysmic variables, which usually accrete via Roche lobe overflow, HMXBs typically undergo mass transfer via the accretion of stellar wind from the massive star onto the compact object. Because massive stars have powerful stellar winds, the X-ray accretion luminosity can be extremely bright, up to 10^{40} erg/s. Although some HMXBs do accrete via Roche lobe overflow, this process is unstable due to the high mass ratio between the two objects and therefore can only last for short timescales.

HMXBs can either be persistent (continuously luminous) or transient (alternating between high- and low-luminosity states). About 40% of galactic HMXBs are transient, including most BeXBs. HMXBs can also exhibit variability, both periodically through pulsations and superorbital modulation and aperiodically through quasi-periodic oscillations, off-states, and flares.

=== Disk-fed accretion ===
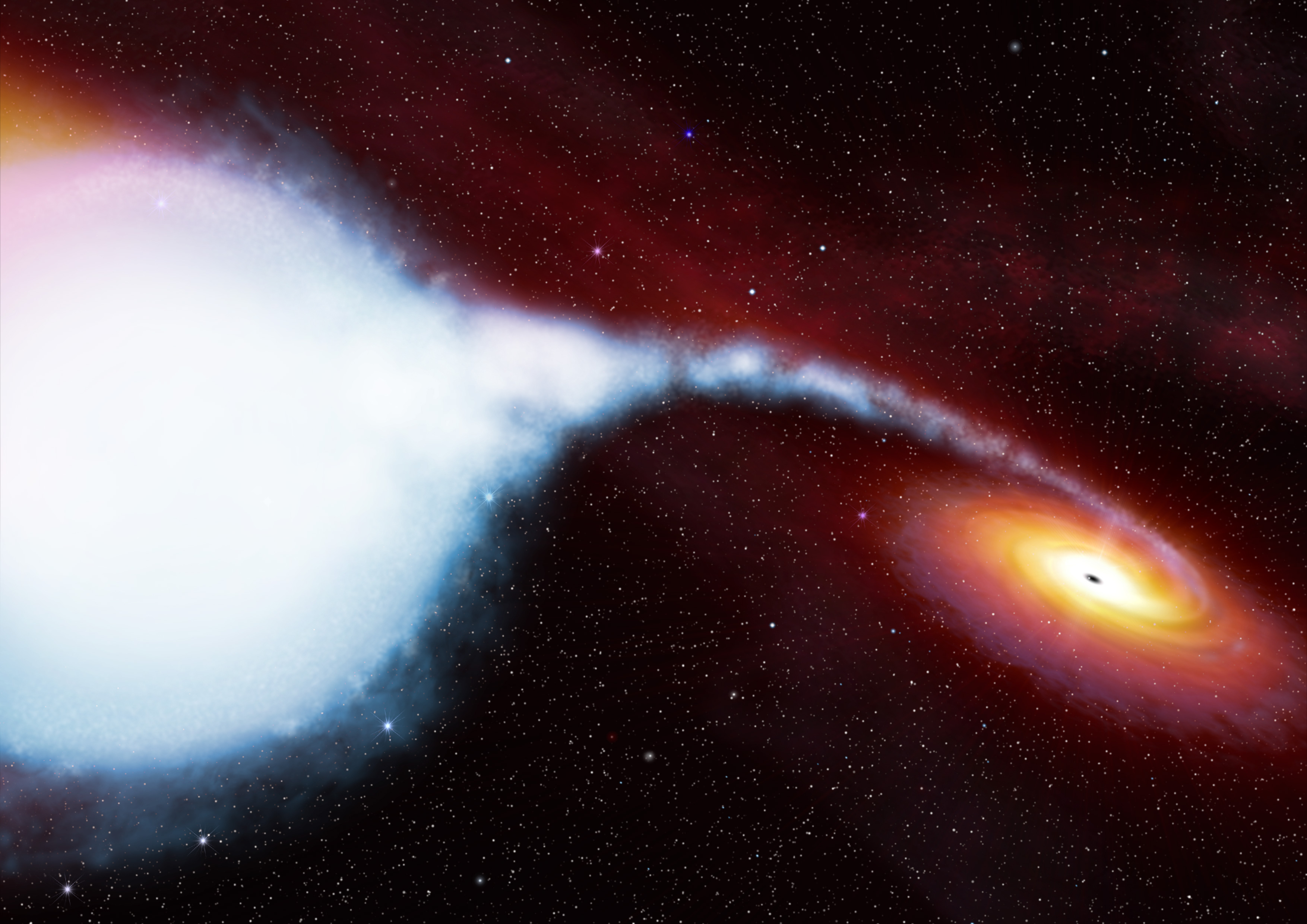
Artist's impression of Cygnus X-1's accretion disk

Several HMXBs are known to be experiencing disk-fed accretion, in which an accretion disk forms around the compact object. These disks can exist in HMXBs that accrete via Roche lobe overflow or from stellar wind, although in the case of the latter, disks are usually temporary and occur when the stellar wind is focused towards the compact object. HMXBs known to have accretion disks include Centaurus X-3, Cygnus X-1, and Vela X-1. Accretion disks may be able to persist in some Be/X-ray binaries, even when they are not actively accreting (quiescent). Disk-fed HMXBs have the shortest orbital periods of any type of HMXB.

=== Wind-fed accretion ===
The vast majority of HMXBs transfer mass via wind-fed accretion, in which the compact object accretes mass shed from the normal star in the form of powerful stellar wind. This wind can have speeds up to 2000 kilometers per second or more. Wind-fed systems usually contain neutron stars, which have magnetic fields that channel the accretion flow towards their poles. Wind-fed HMXBs with closer orbits have higher minimum X-ray luminosities than systems with wider orbits. In the case of NS HMXBs, interactions between the accretion flow and the NS's magnetosphere can cause variability in the system's luminosity.

== Evolution ==
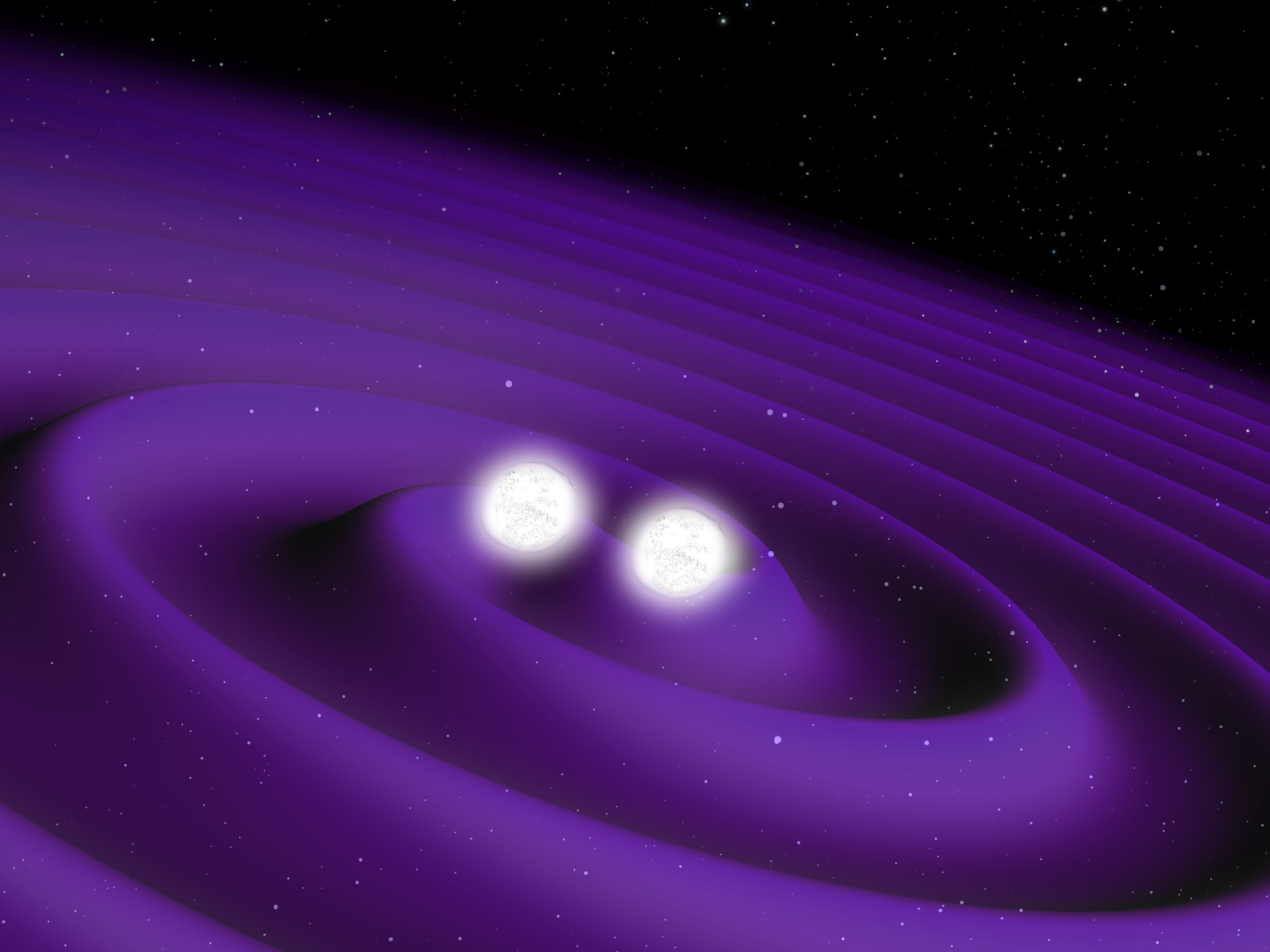
Artist's impressions of colliding NSs (left) and BHs (right). HMXBs are potential progenitors of these merging compact objects.

The HMXB phase typically lasts approximately 10,000 years. Estimates of the ages of HMXBs vary, but are typically short on a cosmic scale, on the order of millions to tens of millions of years. Because high-mass stars evolve quickly, HMXBs become impossible a few hundred million years after their formation. The average BeXB is about 40–50 million years old, and in general, HMXB formation is most efficient 30–60 million years after the binary itself forms. About 10% of neutron stars and black holes are thought to be the accretors in HMXBs at some point in their lifetimes.

In NS HMXBs with relatively short orbital periods, the supergiant will eventually fill its Roche lobe, triggering accretion onto the neutron star. Since the neutron star is much less massive, this mass transfer will be unstable, causing the formation of a common envelope. Drag from the common envelope will cause the two stars to spiral together, likely forming a Thorne–Żytkow object—a cool red supergiant with a dense neutron star core. If the NS HMXBs does survive this phase without merging, it will eventually evolve into a double NS with a short orbital period and eccentric orbit. The first known double neutron star, the Hulse–Taylor binary pulsar, is believed to be the remnant of such an HMXB. The double NSs could eventually merge due to orbital decay from gravitational wave emission, becoming a single black hole.

BH HMXBs, on the other hand, are more likely to survive Roche-lobe overflow or common envelope evolution because their higher mass ratios relative to their companion star makes accretion more stable. Instead, these HMXBs probably evolve into Wolf–Rayet X-ray binaries (WRXBs) with short orbital periods. Eventually, these will become NS-BH or BH-BH binaries. Due to their close proximity, these double compact objects may be able to merge due to gravitational wave emission within timescales less than the age of the universe.

== Subtypes ==
Since HMXBs are mostly wind-fed, their properties depend largely on the properties of the normal star's stellar wind; thus, HMXBs are typically classified based on the type of normal star they host. However, they can also be classed via different factors, such as the type of compact object in the system. The two primary classes of HMXBs are supergiant X-ray binaries (SgXBs) and Be/X-ray binaries (BeXBs), but other categorizations exist.

=== Supergiant X-ray binaries ===
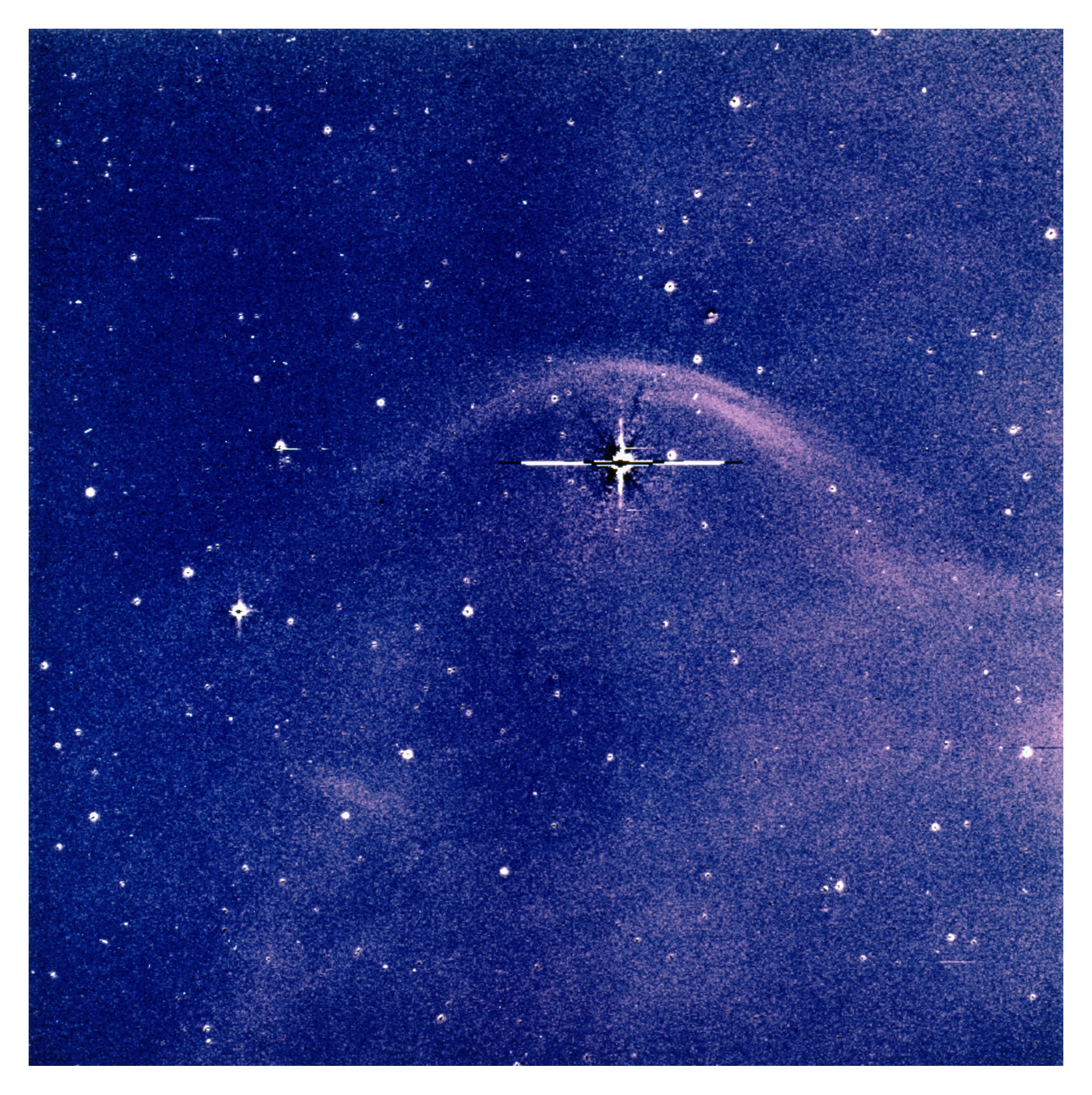
Bow shock around Vela X-1, a NS SgXB

Supergiant X-ray binaries (SgXBs) are HMXBs in which a compact object accretes off of a ~20–50 M_{☉} supergiant (evolved) O- or early-B-type star over an orbital period of days to weeks. These stars are usually filling or close to filling their Roche lobe and lose mass quickly via stellar wind, with rates of 10^{−6}–10^{−5} M_{☉} per year, roughly 3 orders of magnitude higher than for main-sequence O- and B-type stars. The acceleration of stellar winds in these systems depend on the wind's chemical composition, excitation, and ionization, the latter of which is in turn based on the surface temperature of the star and the X-ray emission from the accreting compact object.

SgXBs are typically variable. Several factors can affect their luminosities: for one, the density of stellar winds can change over time. Additionally, as the accretion rate increases, X-ray emission from the accreting compact object decelerates the stellar wind through photoionization. This can even produce a bow shock depending on the orbital motion of the compact object.

==== Supergiant fast X-ray transients ====
Supergiant fast X-ray transients (SFXTs) are a type of transient SgXB that undergo extreme flares, undergoing rapid increases in brightness by up to 5 orders of magnitude over periods of hours. These flares are relatively rare, with SFXTs spending less than 5% of their time in flaring states. Similar to HMXBs in general, most SFXTs are believed to host neutron stars.

Several theories have been put forth to explain the difference between SFXTs and classical SgXBs. One theory is that SFXTs are an early stage of SgXBs where the donor star is more compact and its winds are less structured; differences in SFXT winds compared to classical SgXB winds have been observed. It has also been suggested that flaring states are explained by transitions between different types of accretion. Finally, SFXTs are believed to have longer orbital periods than classical SgXBs, which may explain the periods of quiescence.

=== Be/X-ray binaries ===
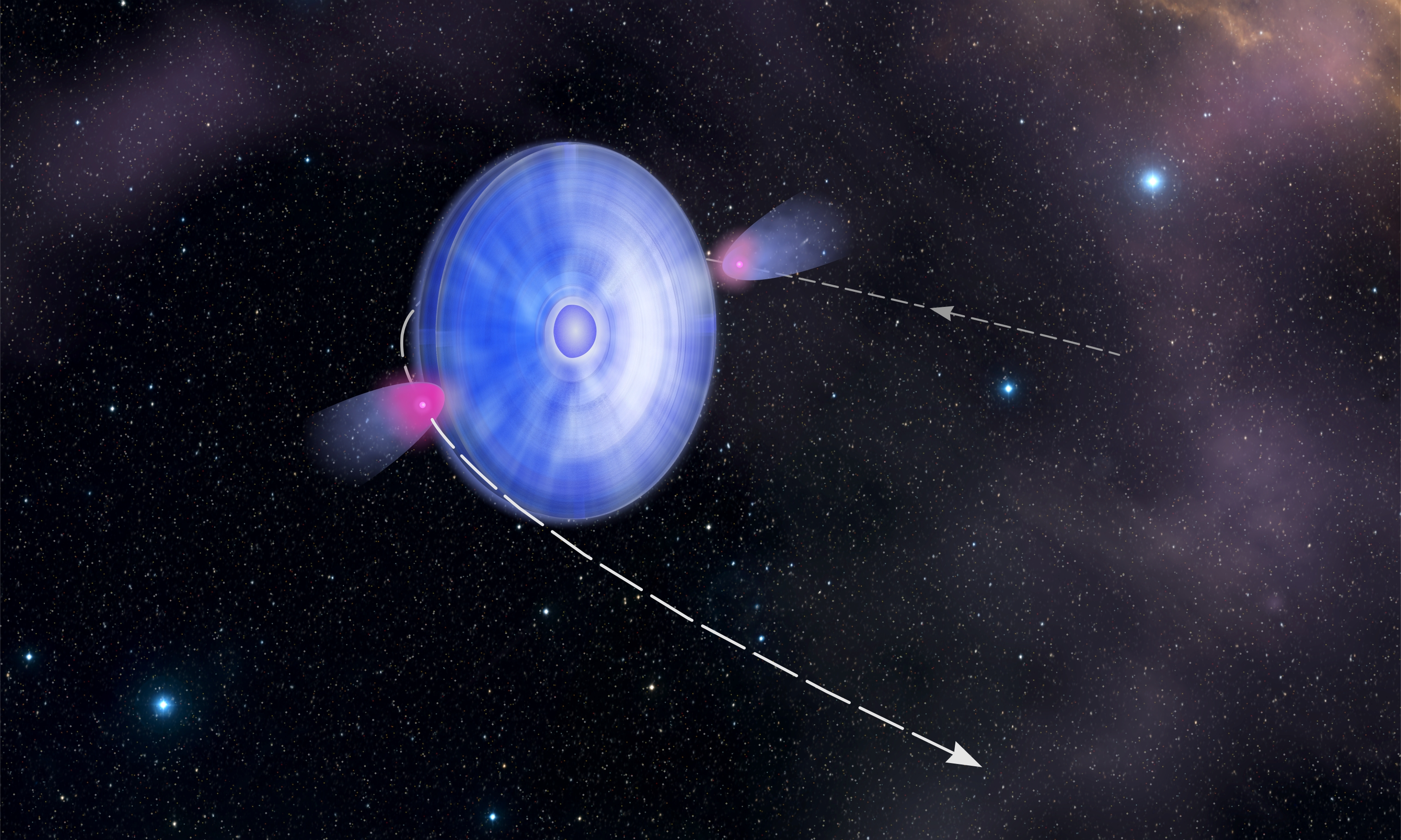
Artist's impression of LS 2883, a Be/X-ray binary containing a neutron star accreting from a Be star's decretion disk. The white dashed line represents the orbital path of the pulsar.

Be/X-ray binaries (BeXBs) are X-ray binaries containing a compact object—almost universally a neutron star—and a Be star or Oe star (the O-type equivalent of a Be star). The donor stars are not close to filling their Roche lobes, but they do have decretion disks, and as the compact object approaches, reaching its periastron, it accretes material from the decretion disk. This causes X-ray outbursts in the case of a NS. BeXBs have longer orbital periods than SgXBs, typically longer than 20 days, and neutron star spin periods from 10^{0}–10^{3}s. The orbital periods and spin periods are positively correlated.

BeXBs can be persistent or transient. Persistent BeXBs typically have longer orbital periods (>200 days) and spin periods (>200s). They also generally have eccentric orbits. Meanwhile, transient BeXBs exhibit X-ray outbursts and have luminosity modulations of three to four orders of magnitude, sometimes reaching the Eddington limit. Transient BeXBs can sometimes form accretion disks around the compact object.

The properties of Be stars, which are still under scientific debate, are important to the dynamics of BeXBs. Thus, the mechanisms behind BeXBs are not fully understood.

=== X-ray pulsars ===
X-ray pulsars (XRPs) are a class of accreting, strongly magnetized NSs in binaries with massive companions. XRPs' magnetic fields are 10^{12} G or more, 6 orders of magnitude higher than any magnetic field ever created on Earth. They accrete plasma from stellar wind, an accretion disk from Roche lobe overflow, or a decretion disk from a Be star. When the accreted material reaches the NS's magnetosphere, the NS's strong magnetic field and the centrifugal force prevent it from moving any closer. Instabilities in the magnetosphere eventually allow the plasma to move through, and the plasma follows the NS's magnetic field lines and is accreted onto the NS's magnetic poles. During this process, the plasma releases kinetic energy in the form of X-rays.

XRP properties can vary widely, with spin periods from 10^{−1}–10^{4} s and X-ray luminosities of 10^{32}–10^{41} erg/s. They are also bright in radio. XRPs' rotational periods can be affected by interactions between the accretion flow and the NS's magnetosphere (spin-up and spin-down). The rotational periods of some XRPs can also change due to glitches and anti-glitches, sudden increases or decreases in spin period respectively. Aperiod variability in their luminosities is associated with accretion and can provide information on the geometry and properties of the accretion flow. Spectral polarization can also reveal properties of the neutron star and its structure.

The first identified XRP was Centaurus X-3 in the early 1970s. XRPs are scientifically useful as their orbital periods can be determined by observing their pulsations; the observed pulsation rate varies due to the Doppler effect as the XRP orbits.

=== Wolf–Rayet X-ray binaries ===
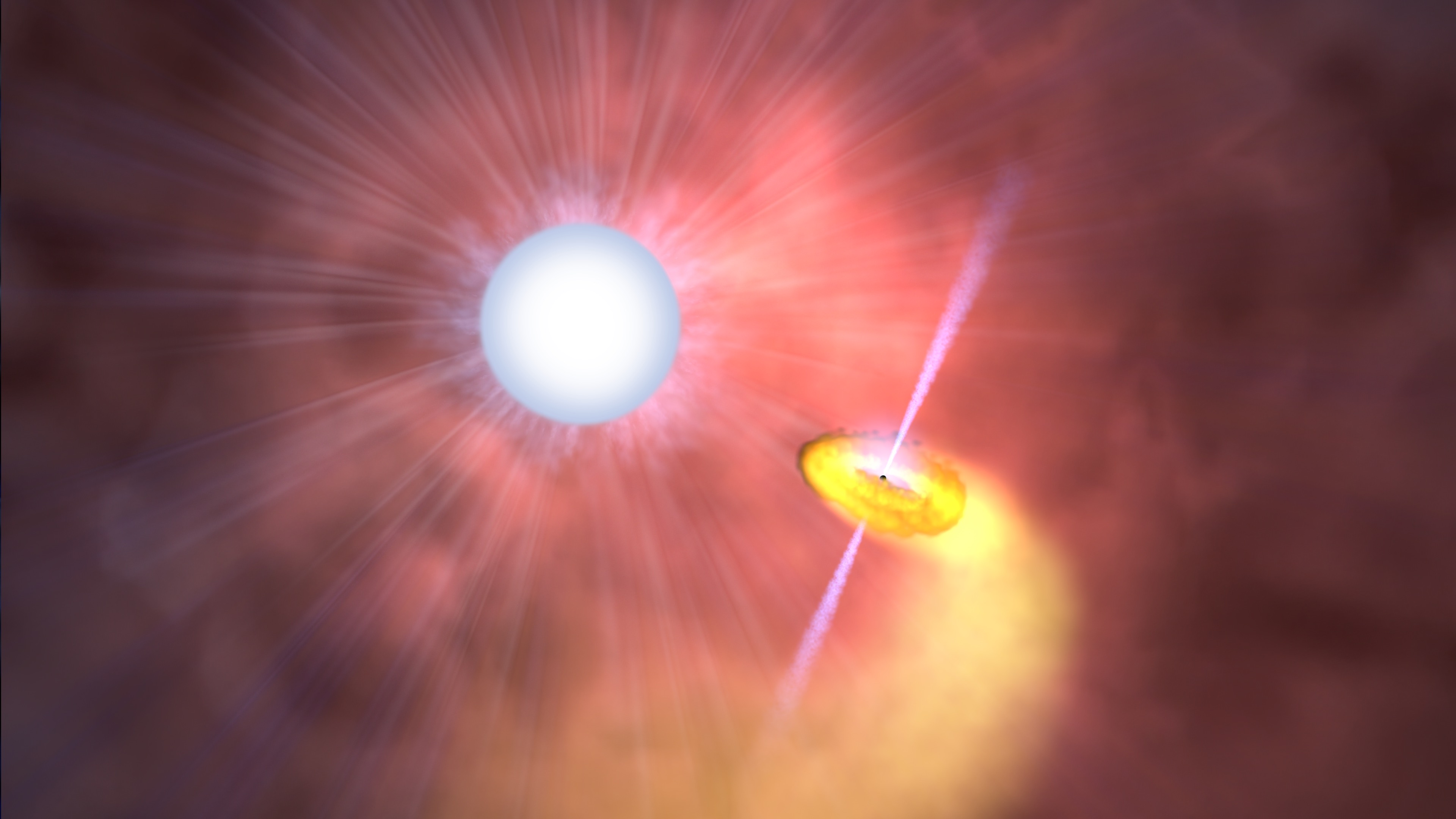
Artist's impression of WRXB Cygnus X-3. The blue-white lines coming from the larger star represent stellar wind.

Wolf–Rayet X-ray binaries (WRXBs) are a type of HMXB containing a Wolf–Rayet star and a compact object. A Wolf–Rayet star is an evolved, high-mass helium star that has lost most of its outer layer of hydrogen and produces high-velocity stellar winds and strong ionized emission lines.

WRXBs are believed to be evolved SgXBs or BeXBs. When the less massive star in the binary starts to evolve, if the binary mass ratio is high enough, the two objects will form a common envelope. If the compact object is a NS, it is likely to spiral in and form a Thorne–Żytkow object. If the compact object is a BH, it can eject the common envelope, surviving spiral-in to become a WRXB with an orbital period of less than a day. Thus, many models predict that most or all WRXBs should contain a BH. Unlike other types of HMXBs, WRXBs must undergo two phases of mass transfer—one phase of common envelope evolution to create the compact object, and another phase of mass transfer to create the WR star.

As of 2023, 2 galactic WRXBs have been discovered—Cygnus X-3 and OAO 1657-415. Cygnus X-3 likely hosts a BH, while OAO 1657-415 is believed to contain a pulsar, contradicting many theories of WRXB formation.

WRXBs, having close orbits and high-mass stars, may eventually evolve into BH-BH binaries that could merge and emit detectable gravitational waves. In turn, observations of gravitational waves from mergers of BH-BH binaries can constrain WR HMXBs.

=== Ultraluminous X-ray sources ===
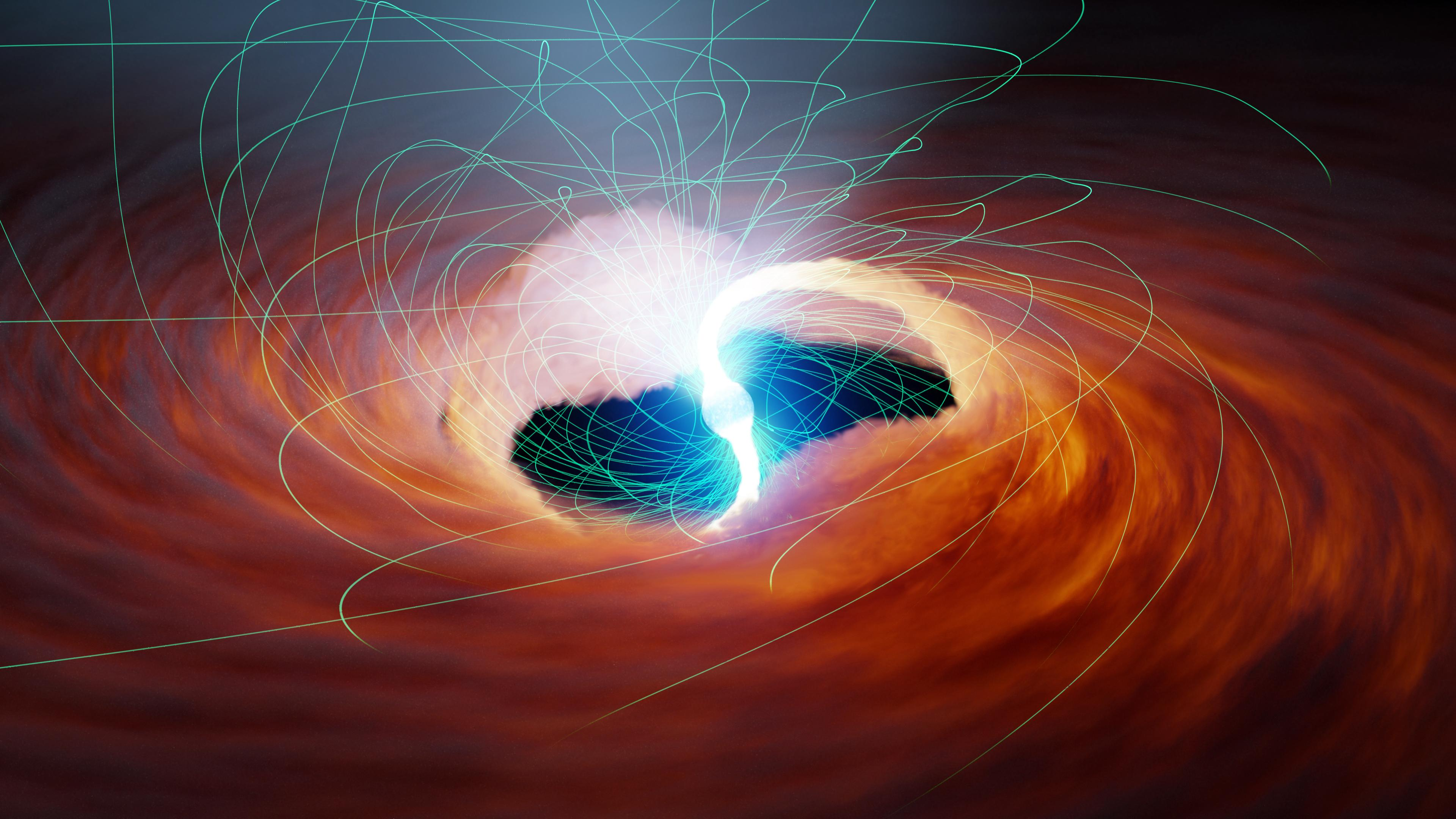
Illustration of a NS ULX, with magnetic field lines in green. It is possible that the strong effects of the NS magnetic field increase its maximum luminosity, allowing it to glow at very high luminosities well above its Eddington limit.

Ultraluminous X-ray sources (ULXs) are a type of bright X-ray source with an X-ray luminosity exceeding 10^{39} erg/s, but which are not active galactic nuclei. Not all ULXs are necessarily HMXBs; IMBHs are also considered candidate ULXs, albeit only as a significant minority. In the case of an HMXB, a prototypical ULX contains a black hole accreting at a super-Eddington (very high) rate. Evidence has been found for stellar-mass BHs in ULXs, such as powerful outflows and bubble nebulae, which are associated with high, super-Eddington accretion rates. ULXs also tend to be in regions where HMXBs are likely to form, such as young OB associations. One well-known HMXB ULX candidate is SS 433.

Some ULXs have been observed to contain neutron stars. Due to their lower mass, NSs would have to be accreting at a rate of 10–100 times higher than their Eddington limit in order to reach the luminosity required to become a ULX. It is not fully known how super-Eddington accretion arises in NSs. ULXs have been observed to be more common in low-metallicity galaxies and in star-forming regions.

=== Gamma-ray binaries ===
Gamma-ray binaries are binary systems that emit most of their radiation at energies above 1 MeV. These systems are believed to contain pulsars. The pulsar's fast rotation (on the order of milliseconds) and high magnetic field (~10^{12} G) creates a relativistic pulsar wind and extracts the pulsar's rotational energy to accelerate it to very high energies. This wind can sometimes interact with the interstellar medium, forming a pulsar wind nebula. A secondary theory is that the gamma rays are generated by relativistic jets. Unlike most NS HMXBs, gamma-ray binaries also emit strongly in radio waves. It is possible that gamma-ray binaries are the first step in a NS HMXB evolutionary pathway.

== Observation ==
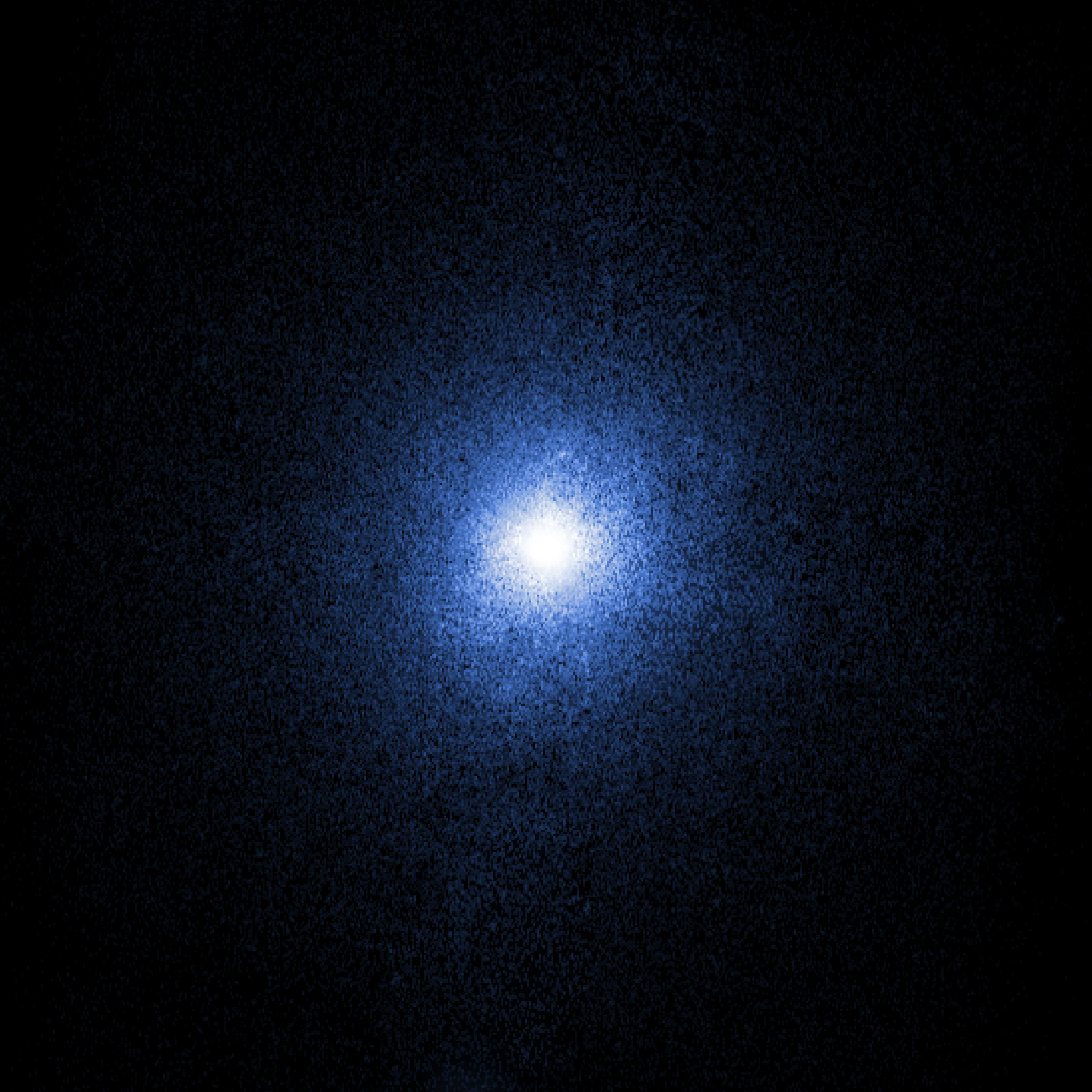
Chandra X-ray image of Cygnus X-1, the first confirmed black hole and one of the most famous HMXBs

Galactic HMXBs were some of the first astronomical X-ray sources detected. Since the 1960s, over 150 have been detected, as well as 200 HMXBs from the Magellanic Clouds and more in other nearby galaxies.

Before the 2000s, the vast majority of known Milky Way HMXBs were BeXBs—only 10% were classed as SgXBs. However, the INTEGRAL telescope, which observed the galactic plane in X-ray wavelengths, led to the discovery of many more SgXBs; about half of its discovered HMXBs were SgXBs. Today, about one-third of known Milky Way HMXBs are SgXBs, although BeXBs still dominate discoveries in the Magellanic Clouds. The INTEGRAL telescope also aided in the discovery of highly obscured HMXBs. However, differences in observations likely do not fully explain the overabundance of BeXBs in the Magellanic Clouds; theories for this deviation include bursts of star formation and lower metallicities in the Magellanic Clouds.

HMXBs are very rare in old star clusters, since by now, all HMXBs would have evolved into single compact objects (having ejected or merged with their binary companion) or double compact object systems. However, in young starburst galaxies, HMXBs are expected to be very prevalent, likely being the largest source of X-ray emission from those galaxies.

=== Differentiating NS and BH HMXBs ===
The vast majority of HMXBs contain NSs, particularly among BeXBs and gamma-ray binaries. As of 2024, only 5 BH HMXBs have been found, including Cygnus X-1, LMC X-1, and LMC X-3. Determining the nature of the compact object in an HMXB can affirm or challenge theories for their formation.

One method that can be used to differentiate NSs and BHs is via direct mass measurement. This can be done via radial velocity measurements of the donor star; however, the estimated mass of the compact object relies heavily on the inclination of the binary system, which can be difficult to constrain. Alternatively, the compact object mass can be measured through the light curves of eclipsing binaries; however, a system must have a sufficiently high inclination for eclipses to be seen, so many systems cannot be measured in this way. Additionally, even if the mass of the compact object is constrained, the potential masses of neutron stars and black holes overlap, so a classification may not always be possible to determine solely based on a mass measurement.

Another way NS and BH HMXBs can be differentiated is via their X-ray spectra. Due to their differing properties, the X-ray spectra of NSs and BHs in HMXB tend to differ. For example, the strong magnetic fields of NSs cause their accretion flows to be directed to their poles. High amounts of electrons moving together scatter photons emitted from the region, resulting in observable absorption lines. Conversely, BH HMXBs undergo transitions between spectral states, and they experience relativistic reflection of matter in the inner accretion disk, broadening their iron emission lines. However, spectral characteristics alone are often not enough to definitively characterize a compact object in an HMXB as a NS or a BH.

Pulsations can also be used to definitively confirm an object as a NS. Pulsating neutron stars (pulsars) produce their beams due to their strong magnetic fields; black holes and their disks are not expected to have such strong magnetic fields, and therefore will not pulse. However, a lack of pulsations does not confirm that a compact object is a BH; a NS may not exhibit obvious or visible pulsations for a variety of reasons, such as its magnetic field geometry and alignment, a long spin period, or even that the pulsar beams are simply not pointed towards Earth.

== See also ==
- Low-mass X-ray binary
- Intermediate-mass X-ray binary
- Stellar vampirism – A generalized form of mass transfer between binary stars
- Gravitational wave background – HMXBs and their descendants may contribute to residual gravitational waves in the universe
- Hypergiant – The most luminous type of high-mass star
