= LS 5039 =

Binary star system in the constellation Scutum

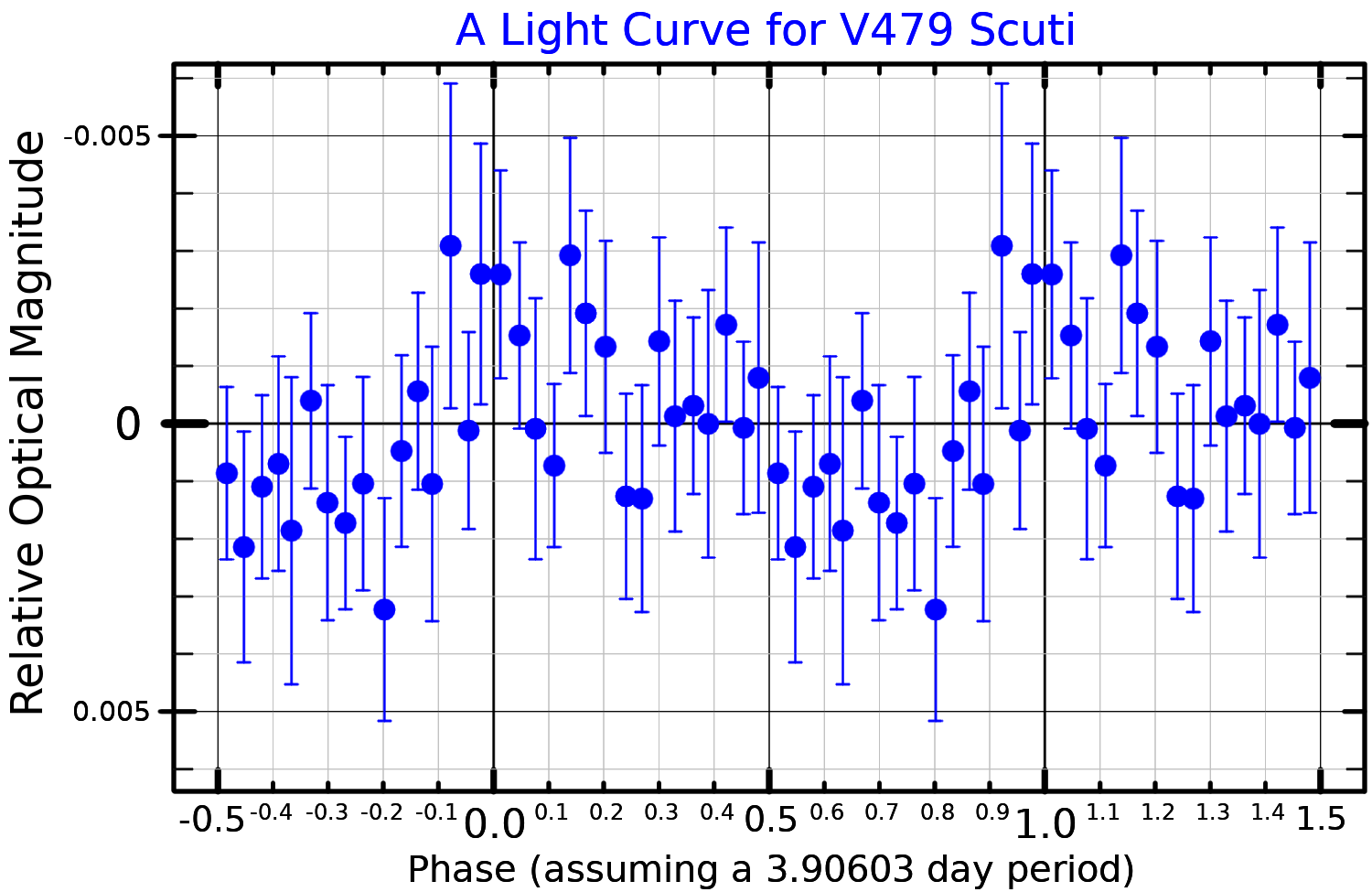
- A broad-band optical light curve for V479 Scuti, adapted from Sarty et al. (2011)

Observation data Epoch J2000 Equinox ICRS
- Constellation: Scutum
- Right ascension: 18^{h} 26^{m} 15.0568^{s}
- Declination: −14° 50′ 54.242″
- Apparent magnitude (V): 11.27

Characteristics
- Spectral type: O(f)N6.5V + Black hole

Astrometry
Radial velocity (R_{v})	17.2 ± 0.7 km/s
Proper motion (μ)	RA: 6.826 mas/yr Dec.: −8.515 mas/yr
Distance	8200±300 ly (2500±100 pc)

Orbit
Period (P)	3.90603 ± 0.00017 d
Eccentricity (e)	0.31 ± 0.04
Inclination (i)	24.9 ± 2.8°
Periastron epoch (T)	HJD 2451943.09 ± 0.10
Argument of periastron (ω) (secondary)	226 ± 8°
Semi-amplitude (K_{1}) (primary)	19.4 ± 0.9 km/s

Details

O star
Mass	22.9+3.4 −2.9 M_{☉}
Radius	9.3+0.7 −0.6 R_{☉}
Luminosity	182000 L_{☉}
Surface gravity (log g)	3.85 cgs
Temperature	39000 K
Rotational velocity (v sin i)	113 km/s

Black hole
Mass	3.7+1.3 −1.0 M_{☉}
Radius	Probably 10.93 km

Other designations
- V479 Sct, TYC 5702-1197-1, 2MASS J18261505-1450542

Database references
SIMBAD	data

LS 5039 is a binary system in the constellation of Scutum. It has an apparent magnitude of 11.27, and it is about 8,200 light-years away.

The "LS" in the system's name refers to the Luminous Stars catalogue which was published by Charles Bruce Stephenson and Nicholas Sanduleak in 1971. In 2001, J. Simon Clark et al. announced that LS 5039 varies in brightness. For that reason, it was given the variable star designation V479 Scuti, in 2006. It is considered to be a possible microquasar.

LS 5039 consists of a massive O-type main-sequence star, and a compact object (likely a black hole) that emits HE (high energy) and VHE (very high energy) gamma rays. It is one of the only three known star systems of this kind, together with LS I +61 303 and PSR B1259-63. The two objects orbit each other every 3.9 days, along a moderately eccentric orbit. Additionally, it is one of the few massive X-ray binaries known to be associated with radio emission.

== See also ==
- LS I +61 303, the only other known VHE gamma ray producing system
