= VERITAS =

Ground-based gamma-ray observatory

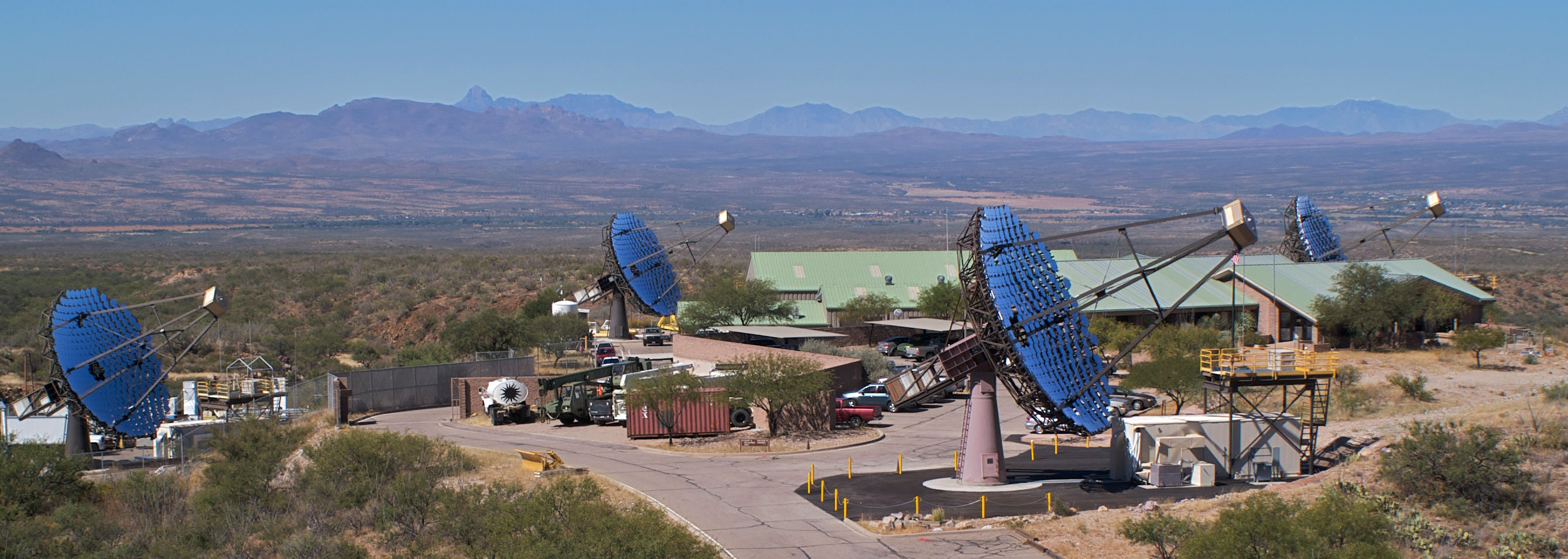
- VERITAS – array of four telescopes
- Alternative names: Very Energetic Radiation Imaging Telescope Array System
- Location: Arizona
- Coordinates: 31°40′30″N 110°57′07″W
- Altitude: 1,268 m (4,160 ft)
- Diameter: 12 m (39 ft 4 in)
- Collecting area: 100,000 m^{2} (1,100,000 sq ft)
- Website: veritas.sao.arizona.edu
- Location within the United States
- Related media on Commons

VERITAS (Very Energetic Radiation Imaging Telescope Array System) is a major ground-based gamma-ray observatory with an array of four 12 meter optical reflectors for gamma-ray astronomy in the GeV – TeV photon energy range. VERITAS uses the Imaging Atmospheric Cherenkov Telescope technique to observe gamma rays that cause particle showers in Earth's atmosphere that are known as extensive air showers. The VERITAS array is located at the Fred Lawrence Whipple Observatory, in southern Arizona, United States. The VERITAS reflector design is similar to the earlier Whipple 10-meter gamma-ray telescope, located at the same site, but is larger in size and has a longer focal length for better control of optical aberrations. VERITAS consists of an array of imaging telescopes deployed to view atmospheric Cherenkov showers from multiple locations to give the highest sensitivity in the 100 GeV – 10 TeV band (with sensitivity from 50 GeV to up to 50 TeV). This very high energy observatory, completed in 2007, effectively complements the Large Area Telescope (LAT) of the Fermi Gamma-ray Space Telescope due to its larger collection area as well as coverage in a higher energy band.

== Specifications and design ==
VERITAS is constructed of four 12 m diameter Imaging Atmospheric Cherenkov Telescopes with an approximate separation of 100 m (330 ft) between each adjacent telescope. Each telescope comprises a large, steerable optical reflector and a high-speed photomultiplier tube camera. Multiple telescopes in an array are needed for stereoscopic observations of the Cherenkov light produced in extensive air showers. These stereoscopic observations allow precise reconstruction of the particle shower geometry, thus giving greatly improved angular and energy resolution compared to a single telescope. The angular direction of the incoming shower is determined by finding the central axis of the spread of the shower on each telescope and tracing those axes until they cross. The intersection of these axes determines the incoming direction of the primary particle (cosmic ray or gamma ray) that initiated the air shower in the upper atmosphere. It also determines the shower core position, i.e. the extrapolated position of the primary particle on the ground had it not interacted. The energy of the primary particle is determined from the total amount of Cherenkov light measured in each telescope, along with the distance of that telescope from the shower core.

Each of the individual telescopes has a 12 m diameter aperture and a 3.5 degree field of view. The telescopes are built on a Davies-Cotton optical design, which uses a spherical reflector and is straight forward to construct and align. This design does cause some time spread in the arrival of Cherenkov photons at the camera, but this spread is small (~ 4 nanoseconds). The reflector consists of 350 individual mirror facets, hexagonal in shape, mounted on a rigid optical support structure. The camera on each telescope has 499 individual pixels (high-speed 26 mm-diameter photomultiplier tubes). VERITAS, like other IACTs, is sensitive to primary particles that produce sufficient atmospheric Cherenkov light to be detectable at the ground. Its full range of sensitivity is from 50 GeV to 50 TeV (although the spectral reconstruction does not start until at least 100 GeV, depending on source strength). The energy and angular resolution depend on the energy of the incident gamma ray but at 1 TeV the energy resolution is ~17%, and the angular resolution is 0.08 degrees (65% containment radius). The entire array has a peak effective area of 100,000 square meters above 1 TeV. A very weak astrophysical source with a gamma-ray flux only 1% of the Crab Nebula can be detected by VERITAS in under 25 hours of observation. Stronger sources can be detected in significantly less time.

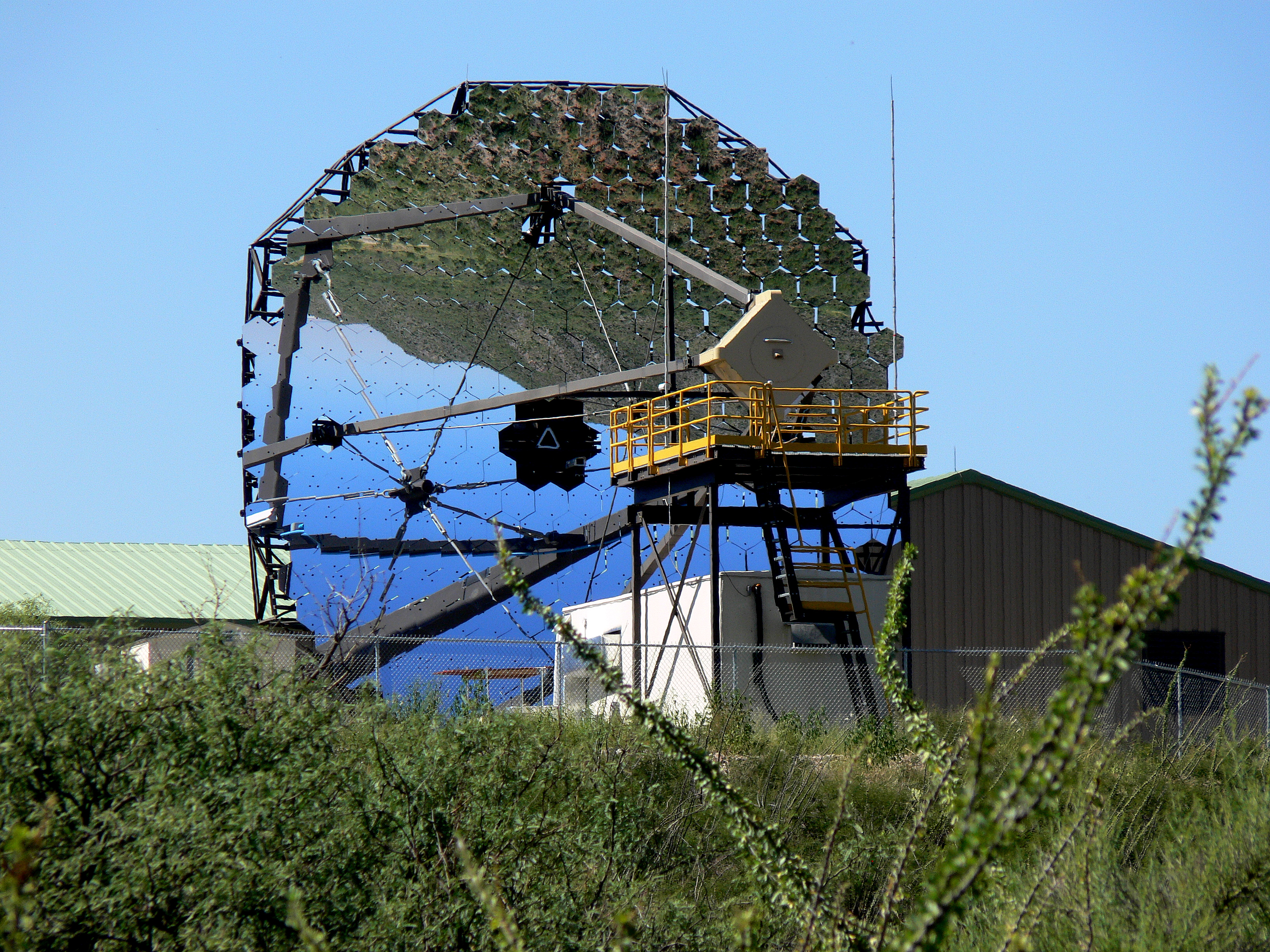
Mirrors on VERITAS telescope 3

In order to distinguish between the background events (i.e. hadronic showers and muons) or noise (i.e. starlight and moonlight) and the targeted data (i.e. electromagnetic showers produced by gamma rays), VERITAS uses a three-level trigger system. Level one corresponds to a level crossing on each pixel using constant fraction discriminators. Level two is a pattern selection trigger, which selects photon-like showers, which have compact shapes, and eliminates most of the background showers, which produce more random shapes in each camera. Level three is the array trigger which looks for a coincidence in the arrival time of the shower at multiple telescopes.

The Cherenkov light that is produced by gamma rays in the upper atmosphere is very dim, so VERITAS observes best under clear, dark skies. Observations are not possible under cloudy or rainy skies, or when the Moon is very bright. However, observations are regularly made when the Moon is dim or moderate in brightness (typically less than 60% illumination). The total yearly observation time is typically around 1,200 hours (of which around 200–250 hours is during brighter moonlight with illumination between 20 and 60%). The observatory does not generally collect data in July or August due to local monsoon conditions.

== History ==
VERITAS was designed to explore the very high energy (VHE) gamma-ray sky above 100 GeV, following up on the success of the Whipple 10 m gamma-ray telescope. The Whipple telescope pioneered the use of an imaging Cherenkov camera, coupled with a large 10 m diameter reflector, to make the first definitive detection of a VHE gamma-ray source, the Crab Nebula in 1989. Subsequently, the HEGRA telescope on La Palma demonstrated good sensitivity above 1 TeV using an array of imaging atmospheric Cherenkov telescopes. VERITAS combines the benefits of stereoscopic observations in an array with large reflectors for a low energy threshold. Compared to the Whipple telescope, VERITAS employs larger 12 m diameter reflectors, improved optics and light collection efficiency, and a finer pixelated camera. Both the recording (using 500 MS/s custom-made Flash-ADCs) and trigger electronics (using a sophisticated three-level system) were significantly improved compared to earlier instruments. VERITAS was conceived in the 1990s, along with three other imaging atmospheric Cherenkov telescope (IACT) arrays: CANGAROO-III, H.E.S.S. and MAGIC. VERITAS is currently the only IACT array operating in the western hemisphere.

The first proposal for VERITAS (called VHEGRA at the time) was submitted by Trevor Weekes (Smithsonian Astrophysical Observatory (SAO)) to the Smithsonian Institution in 1995; this proposal described an array of nine 10 m diameter Cherenkov telescopes. In 1998, the first VERITAS collaboration meeting was held at the University of Chicago. In 2000, the concept of VERITAS as a seven telescope array was recommended by the 2000 Decadal Survey in Astronomy and Astrophysics as a moderate-sized project. Delays were incurred due to difficulties with two proposed sites in Arizona (Montosa Canyon at the base of Mount Hopkins and Kitt Peak) and due to a reduction in available funding. The proposal for a four telescope array (now with 12 m diameter reflectors) was favorably reviewed in 2002 and construction of VERITAS started in 2003 at the Fred Lawrence Whipple Observatory. An initial prototype telescope was completed as Telescope #1 and saw first light in 2004. The construction of Telescope #2 was completed in 2005 and first stereo observations started that year. Telescopes #3 and #4 were completed by early 2007 and the first light celebration for the full for telescope array was on 27-28 April 2007. Regular science operations for VERITAS started in September 2007. The construction of VERITAS was largely funded in the U.S. by Department of Energy, the National Science Foundation, and the Smithsonian Institution. Additional construction funding was provided by Enterprise Ireland (now Science Foundation Ireland) and the Particle Physics and Astronomy Research Council in the United Kingdom.

Improvements and upgrades to VERITAS have been made periodically since 2007. Telescope #1 was moved in the summer of 2009 to a new location for better array geometry (and improved gamma-ray sensitivity). Between 2009 and 2011 an upgrade program was carried out that improved the alignment of the VERITAS mirror facets and replaced the level 2 trigger system. Furthermore, in the summer of 2012 all of the camera photomultiplier tubes were upgraded to high-quantum-efficiency tubes, which again increased the sensitivity, especially near the low end of the gamma-ray energy range. Compared to its initial design sensitivity, the actual achieved sensitivity of VERITAS is significantly better with the time required to detect weak gamma-ray sources reduced by more than a factor of two.

In June 2017, a celebration was held at the Whipple Observatory to celebrate ten years of VERITAS science.

== Science ==
VERITAS has a broad science program that combines key aspects of astronomy, exploring the universe in the new waveband of VHE gamma rays, and physics, searching for new particles of phenomena beyond the standard model of particle physics. The basic questions pursued include: understanding cosmic particle acceleration in our Galaxy (with special emphasis on understanding the origin of cosmic rays) and beyond our Galaxy, probing extreme environments near compact objects such as neutron stars and black holes, the nature of dark matter and the intergalactic magnetic field, and whether the speed of light is constant at these extreme gamma-ray energies. The VERITAS observational program includes Galactic sources such as supernova remnants, pulsars, pulsar wind nebulae, binary systems and the enigmatic gamma-ray source at the Galactic Center. Extragalactic sources include active galactic nuclei, starburst galaxies, and gamma-ray bursts. An important component of VERITAS observations is that associated with multi-wavelength and multi-messenger follow up, including fast radio burst (FRB), high energy neutrino, and gravitational wave events. VERITAS has an extensive dark matter program, in which indirect searches are conducted to find VHE gamma rays resulting from the annihilation of dark matter particles. Most of these searches target the Galactic Center and dwarf spheroidal galaxies. Starting in 2017, the VERITAS science program was expanded to include observations in the optical waveband through high-time-resolution measurements of asteroid occultations and stellar intensity interferometry.

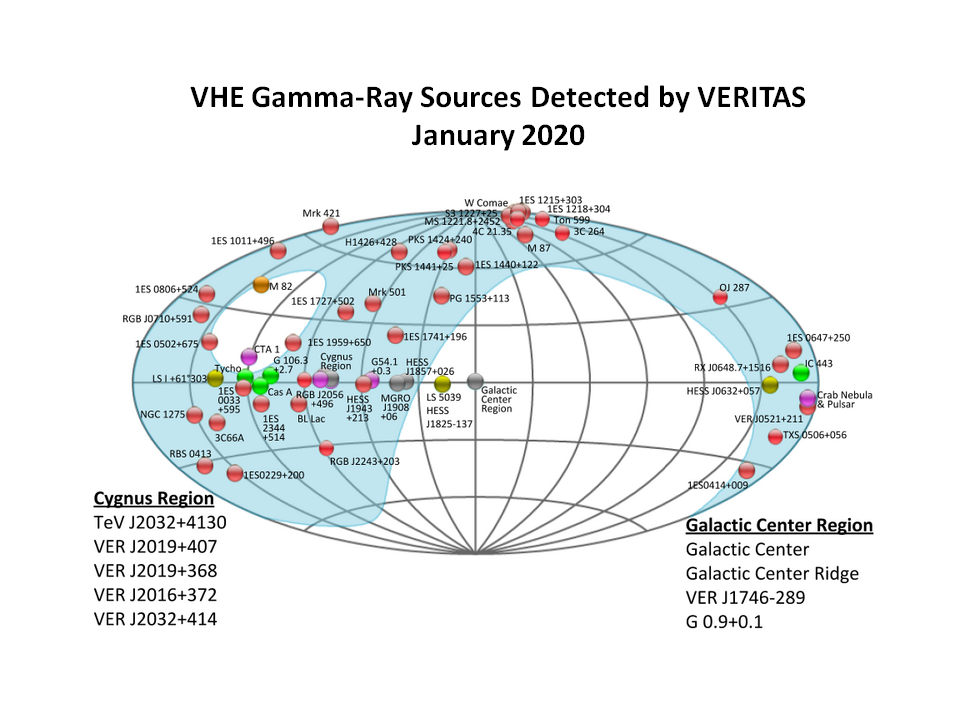
VERITAS Catalog of very high energy gamma-ray sources (as of January 2020)

As of 2020, VERITAS research had led to 58 Ph.D.'s and more than 100 peer-reviewed publications. As shown in the figure, VERITAS has detected 63 astrophysical sources of very high energy gamma rays (as of January 2020). The first VERITAS source catalog had only six sources.

Some of the scientific highlights of VERITAS include:

- 2008: discovery of the first blazar of the intermediate frequency peaked BL Lacertae (IBL) type at very high energies, W Comae followed by a second IBL 3C 66A.
- 2009: discovery of the first starburst galaxy to emit at gamma-ray energies, the Cigar Galaxy or M 82. This result was significant because it represented the first extragalactic object detected where the gamma rays are thought to be produced through typical astrophysical processes found in our Galaxy, as opposed to extreme processes found in the jets of active galactic nuclei.
- 2010; detection of extended gamma-ray emission from the Jellyfish Nebula or IC 443, followed by detailed morphological studies by VERITAS which, when combined with data from Fermi-LAT, provide strong evidence for the acceleration of cosmic rays by a Galactic supernova remnant.
- 2011: discovery of a new and unexpected component of gamma-ray emission above 100 GeV from the Crab Pulsar, seriously challenging existing pulsar models.
- 2011: discovery of TeV gamma-ray emission from the Tycho supernova remnant,; this remnant resulted from one of the few historical supernovae in our Galaxy.
- 2013: locating the gamma-ray emission in the jet of an active galactic nucleus, through the combination of VHE gamma-ray observations made by VERITAS and high angular resolution observations made by the Very Long Baseline Array.
- 2015: detection of TeV gamma rays from the quasar PKS 1441+25 at a redshift value ~ 1, indicating the general transparency of the universe to photons at these energies.
- 2018: detection of VHE gamma rays from direction of the BL Lac object TXS 0506+056, that is coincident with the high-energy neutrino event IC 170922A reported by the IceCube neutrino telescope.
- 2019-2020: direct measurement of stellar angular diameters by an imaging atmospheric Cherenkov telescope and demonstration of stellar intensity interferometry with a modern telescope system.

VERITAS researchers have also pioneered the use of an IACT to carry out Citizen Science. To improve the detection of muon events, the Muon Hunter project was created on the Zooniverse platform. The project showed images taken with VERITAS and citizen volunteers had to classify the images as muon or non-muon events. The researchers then trained a machine learned algorithm that performed better than the standard analysis. In Muon Hunter 2.0 the project will try to improve the result with a different machine learning approach.

== Collaboration ==
The VERITAS collaboration was officially formed by the signing of a teaming agreement in 2000 between nine member institutions in three countries. The member institutions were: Iowa State University, Purdue University, Smithsonian Astrophysical Observatory, University of California, Los Angeles, University of Chicago, University of Utah, and Washington University in St. Louis in the U.S., University of Leeds in the U.K. and National University of Ireland Dublin in Ireland. A tenth member institution, McGill University in Canada, was added with an updated agreement in 2008. Representatives from the member institutions form the VERITAS Executive Council (VEC), that serves as the ultimate decision-making authority within the collaboration.

In 2008, the collaboration was enlarged by the addition of collaborating institutions that have representation on the VERITAS Science Board, that directs the science program of VERITAS. The initial collaborating institutions were: Adler Planetarium, Barnard College, Cork Institute of Technology, DePauw University, Galway-Mayo Institute of Technology, Grinnell College, National University of Ireland, Galway, University of California, Santa Cruz, University of Iowa and University of Massachusetts, Amherst.

As of 2019, the VERITAS collaboration consists of ~80 scientists from institutions in Canada, Germany, Ireland and the U.S. The participating institutions are: Barnard College, Columbia University, Cork Institute of Technology, DESY, Georgia Institute of Technology, Iowa State University, McGill University, National University of Ireland, Galway, Purdue University, Smithsonian Astrophysical Observatory, University College Dublin, University of California, Los Angeles, University of California, Santa Cruz, University of Chicago, University of Delaware, University of Iowa, University of Minnesota, University of Utah, and Washington University in St. Louis. There are also non-affiliated and associate members from a number of other institutions.

The chair of the VERITAS Science Board is the Spokesperson. There is a Deputy Spokesperson to assist in the leadership of the collaboration. A chronological list of the VERITAS Spokespersons and Deputy Spokespersons is given in the table below. Starting in 2007, the Spokesperson/Deputy Spokesperson served a two-year term and may be re-elected.

Dates	Spokesperson	Deputy Spokesperson
2000-2007	Trevor Weekes (SAO)	n/a
2007-2009	Simon Swordy (U. Chicago)	Rene Ong (UCLA)
2009-2011	Rene Ong (UCLA)	Jamie Holder (U. Delaware)
2011-2013	Rene Ong (UCLA)	Reshmi Mukherjee (Barnard College)
2013-2015	Jamie Holder (U. Delaware)	John Finley (Purdue U.)
2015-2017	Reshmi Mukherjee (Barnard College)	Scott Wakely (U. Chicago)
2017-2019	Reshmi Mukherjee (Barnard College)	Scott Wakely (U. Chicago)
2019-2021	John Quinn (UCD)	David Williams (UCSC)
2021-2023	John Quinn (UCD)	Amy Furniss (CSU, East Bay)
2023-2025	Amy Furniss (CSU, East Bay)	Manel Errando (Washington Univ.)

As of 2019, the following agencies provide operational funding for VERITAS: the National Science Foundation and the Smithsonian Institution in the U.S., the Natural Sciences and Engineering Research Council in Canada, the Helmholtz Association in Germany.

== See also ==
- Fermi Gamma-ray Space Telescope
- High Energy Stereoscopic System
- IACT
- List of astronomical observatories
- MAGIC (telescope)
