= Large High Altitude Air Shower Observatory =

Cosmic ray observatory in China

Coordinates: 29°21′31″N 100°08′15″E

The Large High Altitude Air Shower Observatory (LHAASO, 拉索) is a gamma-ray and cosmic-ray observatory in Daocheng, in the Garzê Tibetan Autonomous Prefecture in Sichuan, China. It is designed to observe air showers triggered by gamma rays and cosmic rays. The observatory is at an altitude of 4,410 metres (14,470 ft) above sea level. Observations started in April 2019.

The observatory covers an area of some 145 hectares (360 acres). It has three underground observing pools, each "more than triple the size of the Water Cube (National Aquatic Center) in Beijing". One of the pools is designed to contain 100,000 tonnes (98,000 long tons; 110,000 short tons) of water. The pools will contain 12 telescopes to capture high-energy photons. Cherenkov radiation detectors are used. Research teams from Australia and Thailand will participate in the project directly, with others expressing interest.

The observatory works essentially as the CASA-MIA observatory did but with a bigger surface array, better muon detectors, improved designed layout and at higher altitude.

== Scientific results ==
By 2021, LHAASO has discovered a dozen ultra-high-energy cosmic accelerators within the Milky Way (PeVatrons) and detected photons with energies up to 1.4 PeV.

On 26 February 2024, LHAASO reported the discovery of "a giant ultra-high-energy gamma-ray bubble structure in the Cygnus star-forming region." It contains multiple photons exceeding 1 PeV and at least one reaching 2.5 PeV, leading scientists to identify the presence of a "super cosmic ray accelerator" within the structure.

== See also ==
- List of astronomical observatories
- High Altitude Water Cherenkov Experiment
