= GRO J0422+32 =

Star in the constellation Perseus

Observation data Epoch J2000.0 Equinox ICRS
- Constellation: Perseus
- Right ascension: 04^{h} 21^{m} 42.77^{s}
- Declination: +32° 54′ 26.7″
- Apparent magnitude (V): 13.2
Distance	7,800 ly (2,400 pc)
Spectral type	M4.5V + Black hole

Other designations
- V518 Per, GRO J0422+33, RLC2006 XB2, Granat 0417+335, Nova Persei 1992, Nova Persei 1993, ZGH2005 OS00676-097731 GRO J0422+32, ZGH2005 XS00676B3-003

Database references
SIMBAD	data

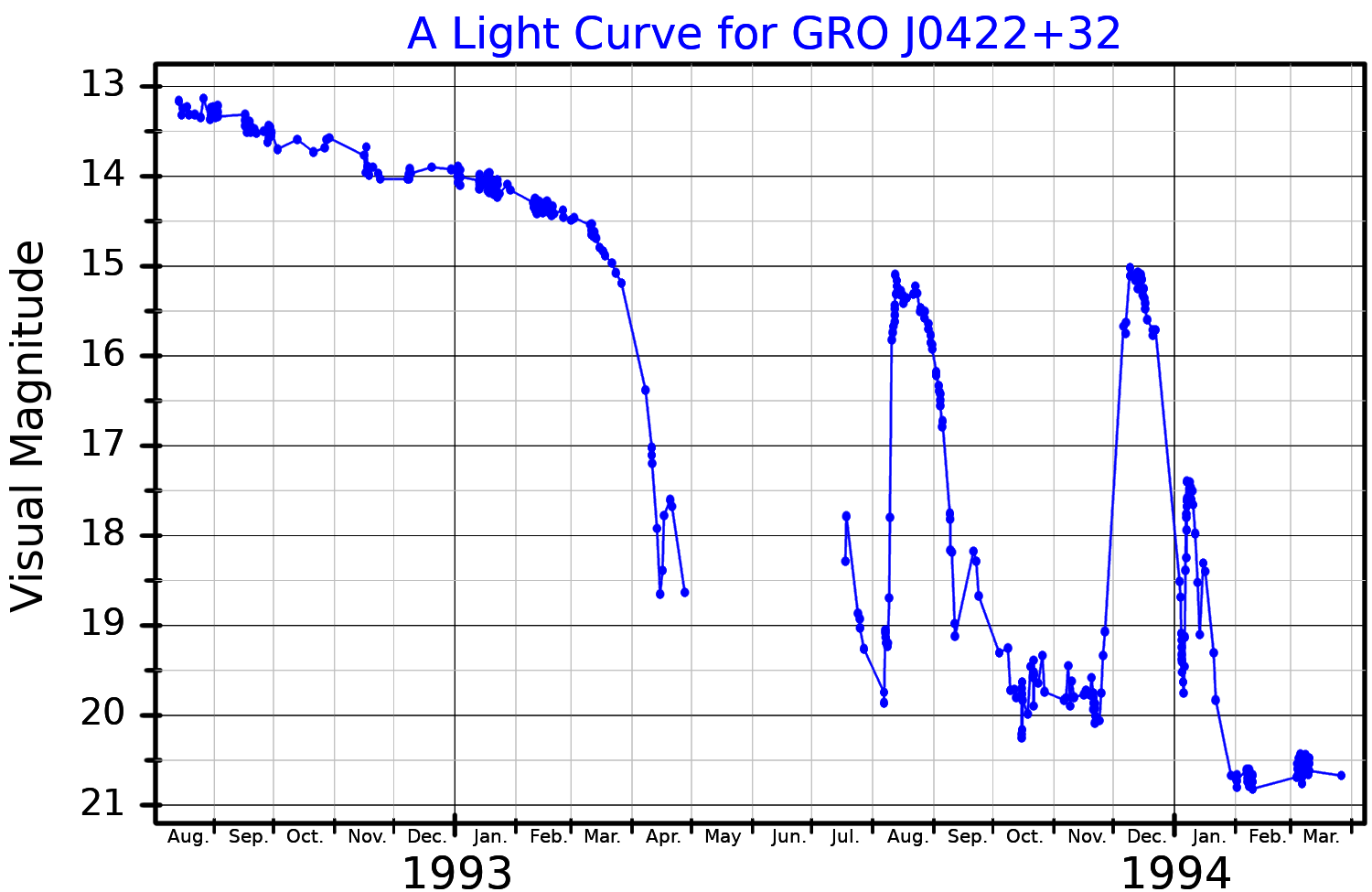
A visual band light curve for GRO J0422+32, adapted from Chevalier and Ilovaiski (1995)

GRO J0422+32 is an X-ray nova and black hole candidate that was discovered by the BATSE instrument on the Compton Gamma Ray Observatory satellite on 5 August 1992. During outburst, it was observed to be stronger than the Crab Nebula gamma-ray source out to photon energies of about 500 keV.

The mass of the black hole in GRO J0422+32 falls in the range 3.66 to 4.97 solar masses. This is the smallest yet found for any stellar black hole, and near the theoretical upper mass limit (~2.7 M_{☉}) for a neutron star. Further analysis in 2012 calculated a mass of 2.1 M_{☉}, which raises questions as to what the object actually is.

It is also known to have a companion M-type main-sequence star, V518 Per, in the constellation Perseus. It has a magnitude of 13.5 in the B spectral band, and 13.2 in the visible band.

== See also ==
- List of nearest black holes
