= Cygnus X-3 =

High mass X-ray binary in the constellation of Cygnus

Observation data Epoch J2000.0 Equinox ICRS
- Constellation: Cygnus
- Right ascension: 20^{h} 32^{m} 25.78^{s}
- Declination: +40° 57′ 27.9″

Characteristics
- Spectral type: WN 4–6

Astrometry
Radial velocity (R_{v})	208+113 −127 km/s
Distance	7,400±1,100 pc
Absolute magnitude (M_{V})	−4.5

Orbit
Period (P)	4.8 hours
Semi-amplitude (K_{1}) (primary)	379+124 −149 km/s

Details

WR
Mass	8–14 M_{☉}
Radius	<2 R_{☉}
Luminosity	209,000+93,000 −64,000 L_{☉}
Temperature	more than 80,000 K

compact object
Mass	2.4+2.1 −1.1 M_{☉}

Other designations
- V1521 Cyg, 18P 57, WR 145a, X Cyg X-3, RX J2032.3+4057, INTEGRAL1 118, 2U 2030+40, 3U 2030+40, 4U 2030+40

Database references
SIMBAD	data

Cygnus X-3 is a high-mass X-ray binary (HMXB), one of the stronger binary X-ray sources in the sky. It is often considered to be a microquasar, and it is believed to be a compact object in a binary system which is pulling in a stream of gas from an ordinary star companion. It is one of only two known HMXBs containing a Wolf–Rayet star. It is invisible visually, but can be observed at radio, infrared, X-ray, and gamma-ray wavelengths.

== Observations ==
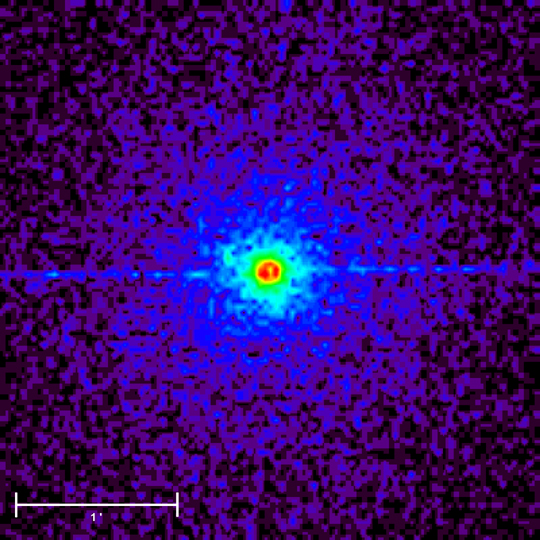
Cygnus X3 and its X-ray halo

Cygnus X-3 is a prominent X-ray source, with soft and hard X-rays both varying in intensity. Periods where the hard X-rays are at minimum intensity are known as soft states. It is less than half a degree from a gamma-ray pulsar, but is itself a weak gamma-ray source. It also shows periodic gamma-ray flares, apparently all occurring during the soft state.

It is undetectable at visual wavelengths due to extreme extinction in the galactic plane. However, there is an infrared point source at its position. Cygnus X-3 is also notable as the only microquasar firmly detected in the high energy gamma rays in the range >100 MeV.

Because of the variations in emission at various wavelengths, Cygnus X-3 has been given the variable star designation V1521 Cygni.

== Flares ==
Cygnus X-3 is notable for its intense X-ray emission, but it is also remarkable for its gamma-ray and radio flares during which it becomes the brightest radio source in the Milky Way. The gamma-ray flares apparently occur in the quiet radio period before a major radio flare.

During the giant radio flares, a relativistic jet has been resolved within about 14° of being aimed directly towards us.

== Binary system ==
Cygnus X-3 shows consistent variations across all wavelengths with a 4.8 h period. The nature of the infrared spectrum and the x-ray emission is interpreted as a binary system containing a Wolf–Rayet (WR) star and a compact object. The 4.8 h variations have been interpreted as eclipses, but this is thought to be unlikely because there are not well-defined periodic dips in the brightness.

The orbit of the binary system is not known accurately, other than the period. Therefore, the masses of the components are not known accurately. Orbital analysis suggested that the mass of the compact object is less than 5 M_{☉}, probably around 2 M_{☉}. It could possibly be a neutron star but is more likely to be a black hole.

While the combination of WR star and compact object would be unique, the WR component will itself almost certainly become a black hole very quickly by astronomical timescales. A supernova or possible direct collapse to a black hole is expected within a million years or so. However, modelling of the Cygnus X-3 system suggests it is most likely that the binary will be disrupted by any supernova event.

The cosmic ray events from Cygnus X-3 had previously led to exotic proposals such as a star made of quarks, but are now explained as being produced in the relativistic jet. The explanation for the unusual relationship between the x-rays and the gamma-ray and radio flares is that the compact objects produces jets along its axis of rotation, within the dense wind from the WR star. These jets evacuate a cocoon within the wind when entering the hard state, and are then quenched by the wind when entering the soft state. Flares are produced during the transition to the hard state as the jets are interacting with the dense wind.

== Distance ==
Cygnus X-3 lies in the direction of the Cygnus OB2 association in the Cygnus X complex, although it is much further away. Its distance can be estimated relative to Cygnus OB2 by studying the X-ray halo produced by dust between us and Cygnus X-3. The distance to Cygnus OB2 is not known precisely, but this method gives possible distances to Cygnus X-3 of 3.4 kpc or 9.3 kpc.

There is a small X-ray source 16″ from Cygnus X-3 that varies with the same period by a phase lag of about 2.7 h. This is thought to be a Bok globule at approximately the same distance as Cygnus X-3. Using molecular line emission from this object, two possible distances are found to be 6.1±0.6 kpc and 7.8±0.6 kpc. A statistical mean is 7.4±1.1 kpc.

== See also ==
- List of nearest black holes
