= PSR B1259−63 =

High mass X-ray binary star in the constellation Centaurus

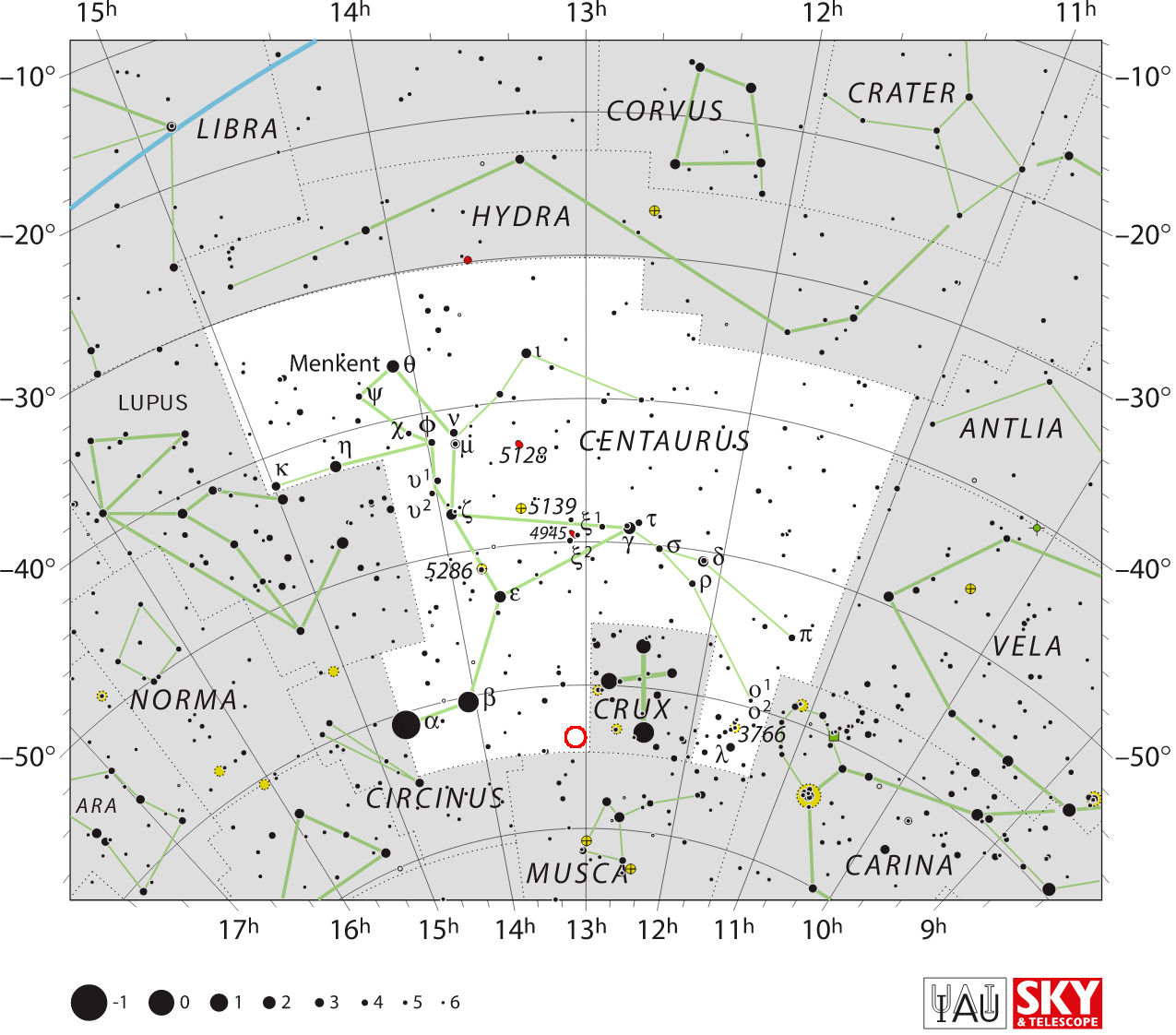
- The location of PSR J1302−6350 (circled in red)

Observation data Epoch J2000 Equinox ICRS
- Constellation: Centaurus
- Right ascension: 13^{h} 02^{m} 47.654^{s}
- Declination: −63° 50′ 08.63″
- Apparent magnitude (V): 9.98

Characteristics
- Evolutionary stage: Pulsar + Main sequence
- Spectral type: O9.5Ve

Astrometry
Proper motion (μ)	RA: −7.093 mas/yr Dec.: −0.342 mas/yr
Parallax (π)	0.4434±0.0133 mas
Distance	7,400 ± 200 ly (2,260 ± 70 pc)

Orbit
Name	SS 2883
Period (P)	3.389 years (1,237 days)
Eccentricity (e)	0.87
Inclination (i)	36°

Details

Pulsar
Rotation	47.7625075 ms
Age	332,000 years

O-type star
Mass	22.5 M_{☉}
Radius	10.4 R_{☉}
Luminosity	160,000 L_{☉}
Surface gravity (log g)	3.84 cgs
Temperature	35,610 K
Rotational velocity (v sin i)	280 km/s

Other designations
- AAVSO 1256−63, ALS 2883, AX J1302−638, CPD-63° 2495, GSC 08997-01597, Hbg 757, Hen 3-852, INTREF 538, LS 2883, MSX6C G304.1845-00.9916, PSR B1259−63 PSR J1302−6350, THA 17-8, TYC 8997-1597-1, UCAC2 3710789, WRAY 15-1053

Database references
SIMBAD	data

PSR B1259−63 is a pulsar and member of an eclipsing binary star system with the blue O9.5Ve-class star SS 2883. The pair has an eccentric orbit that is inclined to the line of sight from Earth by about 36°, leading to a 40-day-long eclipse each time the pulsar passes behind the star. The pulsar has a period of 47.762 milliseconds (ms) and a luminosity of 8.3 × 10^{35} erg/s. It emits very high energy gamma rays that vary on a time scale of several days.

The star SS 2883 has about 22.5 solar masses and is 10.4 solar radii in size. The rate of rotation is about 280 km/s at the equator, or 70% of the breakup velocity.
