= X-1 =

X-1 may refer to:

== Arts, entertainment, and media ==
- X Minus One, a 1950s American radio show
- X-Men (film), the first film in the X-Men franchise
- X-One, monthly magazine produced by Imagine Publishing

== Transportation ==
=== Aircraft ===
- Bell X-1, the first aircraft to exceed the speed of sound in controlled level flight

=== Automobiles ===
- Lada X-1, a 1981 Soviet concept MPV
- McLaren X-1, a 2012 British one-off sports car based on the 12C

=== Cycles ===
- Sinclair X-1, an electrically assisted faired recumbent bicycle
- Yamaha X-1, a commuter-style motorbike

=== Watercraft ===
- X-1 Submarine, the United States Navy's only midget submarine

== Technology ==
- Xbox One, a video game console
- a one-lane PCI Express slot

== Astronomical X-ray sources ==
- Aquila X-1
- Circinus X-1
- Cygnus X-1
- Hercules X-1
- IC 10 X-1
- LMC X-1
- M82 X-1, a candidate intermediate-mass black hole detected in January 2006
- Monoceros X-1
- NGC 300 X-1
- SMC X-1
- Scorpius X-1
- Vela X-1

== Other ==
- x^{−1}, the multiplicative inverse of x (another way to denote 1/x, one divided by x)

== See also ==
- X1 (disambiguation)
- 1X (disambiguation)
