= Schwarzschild radius =

Radius of the event horizon of a Schwarzschild black hole

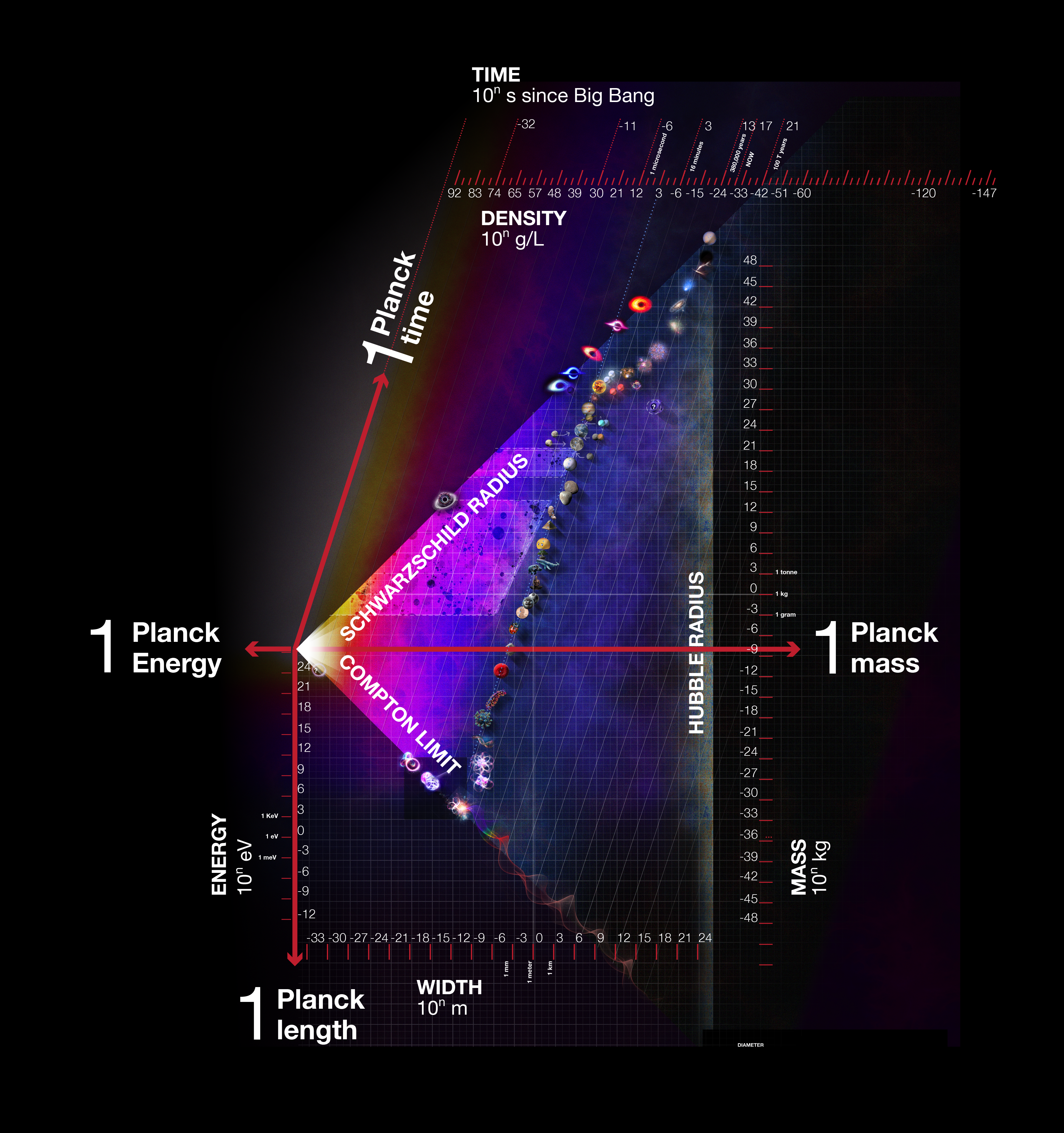
In this mass–radius plot, the Schwarzschild radius is shown as a lower limit on radii of isolated objects, and below the Compton limit quantum effects become significant. The Hubble radius gives a very rough sense of the scale of the observable Universe.

The Schwarzschild radius is a parameter in the Schwarzschild solution to Einstein's field equations that corresponds to the radius of a sphere in flat space that has the same surface area as that of the event horizon of a Schwarzschild black hole of a given mass. It is a characteristic quantity that may be associated with any amount of mass. The Schwarzschild radius is named after German astronomer Karl Schwarzschild, who calculated this solution for general relativity in 1916.

The Schwarzschild radius is given as
$$r_\text{s} = \frac{2 G M}{c^2} ,$$
where G is the gravitational constant, M is the mass of the object, and c is the speed of light.

== History ==
In 1916, Karl Schwarzschild obtained an exact solution to the Einstein field equations for the gravitational field outside a non-rotating, spherically symmetric body with mass $M$ (see Schwarzschild metric). The solution contained terms of the form:
$$\frac{1}{1 - \frac{r_{\mathrm{s}}}{r}} .$$
These terms have singularities at $r = 0$ and $r = r_{\mathrm{s}}$. The parameter $r_\text{s}$ is known as the Schwarzschild radius. The physical significance of these singularities was debated for decades. Singular terms in the metric are indicative, but not predicative, of a spacetime singularity: they point to a possible singularity but do not establish one. At $r = r_\text{s}$, the apparent divergence is a coordinate singularity that is absent in horizon-penetrating systems such as Eddington–Finkelstein and Kruskal–Szekeres coordinates. At $r = 0$, however, curvature invariants diverge, establishing a spacetime singularity that cannot be removed by a change of coordinates. Despite the coordinate singularity at $r = r_{\mathrm{s}}$, the Schwarzschild radius remains theoretically and physically significant because it demarcates the event horizon of a Schwarzschild black hole.

== Parameters ==
The Schwarzschild radius of an object is proportional to its mass. The Sun has a Schwarzschild radius of about 3.0 km (1.9 mi),; Earth's is about 9 mm (0.35 in), and the Moon's is about 0.1 mm (0.004 in).

Table of example Schwarzschild radii
Object	Mass $M$	Schwarzschild radius $\frac{2GM}{c^2}$	Actual radius $r$	Schwarzschild density $\frac{3c^6}{32\pi G^3M^2}$ or $\frac{3c^2}{8\pi Gr^2}$
Milky Way	1.6×10^{42} kg	2.4×10^{15} m (0.25 ly)	5×10^{20} m (52900 ly)	0.000029 kg/m^{3}
SMBH in Phoenix A (one of the largest known black holes)	2×10^{41} kg	3×10^{14} m (~2000 AU)		0.0018 kg/m^{3}
Ton 618	1.3×10^{41} kg	1.9×10^{14} m (~1300 AU)		0.0045 kg/m^{3}
SMBH in NGC 4889	4.2×10^{40} kg	6.2×10^{13} m (~410 AU)		0.042 kg/m^{3}
SMBH in Messier 87	1.3×10^{40} kg	1.9×10^{13} m (~130 AU)		0.44 kg/m^{3}
SMBH in Andromeda Galaxy	3.4×10^{38} kg	5.0×10^{11} m (3.3 AU)		640 kg/m^{3}
Sagittarius A* (SMBH in Milky Way)	8.26×10^{36} kg	1.23×10^{10} m (0.08 AU)		1.068×10^{6} kg/m^{3}
SMBH in NGC 4395	7.1568×10^{35} kg	1.062×10^{9} m (1.53 R_{☉})		1.4230×10^{8} kg/m^{3}
Potential intermediate black hole in HCN-0.009-0.044	6.3616×10^{34} kg	9.44×10^{7} m (14.8 R_{⊕})		1.8011×10^{10} kg/m^{3}
Resulting intermediate black hole from GW190521 merger	2.823×10^{32} kg	4.189×10^{5} m (0.066 R_{⊕})		9.125×10^{14} kg/m^{3}
Sun	1.99×10^{30} kg	2.95×10^{3} m	7.0×10^{8} m	1.84×10^{19} kg/m^{3}
Jupiter	1.90×10^{27} kg	2.82 m	7.0×10^{7} m	2.02×10^{25} kg/m^{3}
Saturn	5.683×10^{26} kg	8.42×10^{−1} m	6.03×10^{7} m	2.27×10^{26} kg/m^{3}
Neptune	1.024×10^{26} kg	1.52×10^{−1} m	2.47×10^{7} m	6.97×10^{27} kg/m^{3}
Uranus	8.681×10^{25} kg	1.29×10^{−1} m	2.56×10^{7} m	9.68×10^{27} kg/m^{3}
Earth	5.97×10^{24} kg	8.87×10^{−3} m	6.37×10^{6} m	2.04×10^{30} kg/m^{3}
Venus	4.867×10^{24} kg	7.21×10^{−3} m	6.05×10^{6} m	3.10×10^{30} kg/m^{3}
Mars	6.39×10^{23} kg	9.47×10^{−4} m	3.39×10^{6} m	1.80×10^{32} kg/m^{3}
Mercury	3.285×10^{23} kg	4.87×10^{−4} m	2.44×10^{6} m	6.79×10^{32} kg/m^{3}
Moon	7.35×10^{22} kg	1.09×10^{−4} m	1.74×10^{6} m	1.35×10^{34} kg/m^{3}
Human	70 kg	1.04×10^{−25} m	~ 5×10^{−1} m	1.49×10^{76} kg/m^{3}
Planck mass	2.18×10^{−8} kg	3.23×10^{−35} m (2 l_{P})		1.54×10^{95} kg/m^{3}

== Black hole classification by Schwarzschild radius ==
Black hole classifications
Class	Approx. mass	Approx. radius
Supermassive black hole	10^{5}–10^{11} M_{Sun}	0.002–2000 AU
Intermediate-mass black hole	10^{3} M_{Sun}	3000 km ≈ R_{Mars}
Stellar black hole	10 M_{Sun}	30 km
Micro black hole	up to M_{Moon}	up to 0.1 mm

Any object whose radius is smaller than its Schwarzschild radius is called a black hole. The surface at the Schwarzschild radius acts as an event horizon in a non-rotating body (a rotating black hole operates slightly differently). Neither light nor particles can escape through this surface from the region inside, hence the name "black hole".

Black holes can be classified based on their Schwarzschild radius, or equivalently, by their density, where density is defined as mass divided by the volume of its Schwarzschild sphere. The Schwarzschild radius is linearly related to mass, while the enclosed volume corresponds to the third power of the radius, so small black holes are much denser than large ones. The volume within the event horizon of the most massive black holes has an average density lower than main sequence stars.

=== Supermassive black hole ===
A supermassive black hole (SMBH) is the largest type of black hole, though there are few official criteria on how such an object is considered so, on the order of hundreds of thousands to billions of solar masses. (SMBHs up to 21 billion (2.1 × 10^{10}) M_{☉} have been detected, such as NGC 4889.) Unlike stellar mass black holes, the biggest black holes have extremely low densities. (A (non-rotating) black hole is a spherical region in space that surrounds the singularity at its center; it is not the singularity itself.) Thus, an SMBH can be less dense than water.

The Schwarzschild radius of a body is proportional to its mass. In contrast, the radius of a body is proportional to the cube root of its volume. Therefore, as the body accumulates matter at a fixed density (in this example, 997 kg/m^{3}, the density of water), its Schwarzschild radius increases faster than its physical radius. When a body of this density has grown to around 136 million solar masses (1.36 × 10^{8} M_{☉}), its physical radius is overtaken by its Schwarzschild radius, forming an SMBH.

It is thought that SMBHs like these do not form immediately from the singular collapse of a cluster of stars. Instead they may begin life as smaller, stellar-size black holes and grow larger by the accretion of matter, or even of other black holes.

The Schwarzschild radius of Sagittarius A* (the SMBH at the Galactic Center of the Milky Way) is about 12 million kilometres (12 gigametres). Its mass is about 4.1 million M_{☉}.

=== Stellar black hole ===
Stellar black holes are much denser than SMBHs. If one accumulates matter at nuclear density (the density of an atomic nucleus, ~10^{18} kg/m^{3}; neutron stars also reach this density), such an accumulation would fall within its own Schwarzschild radius at ~3 M_{☉} and thus would be a stellar black hole.

=== Micro black hole ===
A small mass has a tiny Schwarzschild radius. A black hole of mass similar to Mount Everest, 6.3715×10^{14} kg, would have a Schwarzschild radius much less than a nanometre. The Schwarzschild radius would be 2 × 6.6738×10^{−11} m^{3}⋅kg^{−1}⋅s^{−2} × 6.3715×10^{14} kg / (299792458 m⋅s^{−1})^{2} = 9.46×10^{−13} m = 9.46×10^{−4} nm. Its density would be so high that no known mechanism can form such extremely compact objects. Such black holes might possibly have been formed in an early stage of the evolution of the universe, just after the Big Bang, when densities of matter were extremely high. Therefore, these hypothetical miniature black holes are called primordial black holes.

== Other uses ==
=== In gravitational time dilation ===
Gravitational time dilation near a large, slowly rotating, nearly spherical body, such as the Earth or Sun can be reasonably approximated as follows:
$$\frac{t_r}{t} = \sqrt{1 - \frac{r_\mathrm{s}}{r}}$$
where:

- t_{r} is the elapsed time for an observer at radial coordinate r within the gravitational field;
- t is the elapsed time for an observer distant from the massive object (and therefore outside of the gravitational field);
- r is the radial coordinate of the observer (which is analogous to the classical distance from the center of the object);
- r_{s} is the Schwarzschild radius.

=== Compton wavelength intersection ===
The reduced Compton wavelength, $\hbar/M c$, is a characteristic length dividing regimes where classical theories are effective from ones where quantum effects are evident. The Schwarzschild radius ($2 G M/c^2$) of a given mass $M$ equals twice its reduced Compton wavelength when $M$ equals one Planck mass ($M = \sqrt{\hbar c/G}$); both are then equal to the Planck length ($\sqrt{\hbar G/c^3}$). Extrapolating the Compton and Schwarzschild relations to their intersection is likely to require corrections due to quantum gravity.

== Gravitational radius ==
The term gravitational radius is sometimes used a synonym for the Schwarzschild radius and sometimes it names a constant half as large, $R_\textrm{G}= GM/c^2$. This term is therefore avoided in educational settings.

== See also ==
- Black hole
- Chandrasekhar limit
- John Michell
- Schwarzschild (static) black hole
- Rotating (Kerr) black hole
- Charged black hole
