= List of fastest rotating black holes =

Below is a list of fastest rotating black holes measured in the dimensionless rotational parameter a.

Diagram showing how a black hole's structure changes as a approaches 1, as described by the Kerr metric.

== Methodologies for spin measurements ==
Accreting black hole spins can be measured by observing the X-ray spectrum of the black hole and identifying spectral features caused by certain characteristics of the accretion disc. This can be used to determine the innermost stable circular orbit and hence the spin. Another method measures the radiative efficiency of the accretion disc.

== List ==
=== Prograde rotation ===
List of fastest prograde-rotating black holes
Black hole name	Spin	Inclination	Notes
SMBH in F2MS J0834+3506	0.993+0.005 −0.003	62+8 −12°	
SMBH in S82X 0022+0020	0.989+0.009 −0.019	48+2 −3°	
SWIFT J1753.5-0127	0.989+0.007 −0.035	73±8°	
MAXI J1803-298	0.987+0.037 −0.007	72+9 −6°	
XTE J1859+226	0.986+0.001 −0.004 – 0.987±0.003	71.2+0.4 −0.8°	
SMBH in S82X 0043+0052	0.985±0.005	53+7 −8°	
MAXI J0637-430	0.984+0.042 −0.012	63+10 −9°	
SMBH in S82X 0011+0057	0.983±0.015	52+8 −7°	
SMBH in F2MS J1540+4923	0.983+0.015 −0.021	52+8 −7°	
GRS 1758–258	0.980+0.014 −0.058	67+8 −13°	
MAXI J1535-571	0.979+0.049 −0.015	44+19 −17°	
MAXI J1348-630	0.977+0.055 −0.017	52+11 −8°	
GRS 1915+105	0.976+0.056 −0.018	60+8 −8°	
GX 339-4	0.970+0.076 −0.026	49+14 −14°	
GRS 1716–249	0.970+0.060 −0.022	59+12 −7°	
GRS 1739–278	0.968+0.074 −0.022	70+11 −5°	
MAXI J1820+070	0.967+0.061 −0.025	64+9 −8°	
IGR J17091-3624	0.963+0.085 −0.027	47+11 −10°	
MAXI J1727-203	0.962+0.414 −0.034	65+14 −11°	
4U 1543–47	0.959+0.079 −0.031	67+8 −7°	
EXO 1846–031	0.959+0.077 −0.031	62+10 −9°	
SMBH in S82X 0242+0005	0.959+0.039 −0.069	48+2 −3°	
MAXI J1631-479	0.951+0.077 −0.039	22+12 −10°	
Swift J1658.2-4242	0.951+0.069 −0.031	50+10 −9°	
Cygnus X-1	0.950+0.084 −0.04	47+11 −9°	
H 1743–322	0.949+0.127 −0.039	54+13 −12°	
SMBH in S82X 0302–0003	0.940+0.058 −0.112	45°	
V404 Cygni	0.935+0.075 −0.037	37+8 −9°	
IGR J17454-2919	0.932+0.363 −0.06	54+14 −15°	
LMC X-3	0.928+0.146 −0.058	38+13 −14°	
SMBH in SDSS J1209-0107	0.928+0.066 −0.124	47+3 −2°	
SMBH in F2M J1531+2423	0.917+0.081 −0.159	48+7 −3°	
SMBH in F2M J1715+2807	0.917+0.075 −0.139	47+3 −2°	
AT 2019wey	0.906+0.202 −0.084	14+10 −12°	
4U 1957+11	0.900+0.28 −0.08	52+13 −12°	

== See also ==
- List of most massive black holes
- Orders of magnitude (speed)
