= X1 =

X1 or X-one may refer to:

== Transportation ==
=== Automobiles ===
- BMW X1, a 2009–present German subcompact luxury SUV
- Geely Yuanjing X1, a 2017–2021 Chinese mini crossover
- Red Bull X1, the former name of the Red Bull X2010, a fictional car created for the game Gran Turismo 5
- Wrightspeed X1, a 2008 electric sports car prototype based on the Ariel Atom

=== Bus routes ===
- X1 (Metrobus), a bus route in Washington, District of Columbia, United States
- X1 (New York City bus), a bus route in New York City, New York, United States
- X1 Steel Link, a bus rapid transit service between Sheffield, Rotherham, and Maltby in England, United Kingdom
- Excel X1, a bus route from Lowestoft to Peterborough in England, United Kingdom
- X1 Glasgow–Hamilton, a former bus route in Scotland
- Green Line routes X1 and X10, a former coach route from Southend-on-Sea to London

=== Rail transport ===
- SL X1, a former Swedish commuter train built by ASEA
- LNER Class X1, a single locomotive rebuilt several times in its history

=== Watercraft ===
- X1 (dinghy), a fast, light-weight sailing dinghy designed for inland racing
- HM Submarine X1, a Royal Navy submarine

=== Aircraft ===
- Bell X-1, an experimental rocket plane

== Technology ==
- Sharp X1, a Japanese home computer manufactured by the Sharp Corporation
- Xbox One, a video game console
- a one-lane PCI Express slot
- Cray X1, a supercomputer sold in the 2000s
- Electrologica X1, an early Dutch computer
- Sony Ericsson Xperia X1, a mobile phone
- ThinkPad X1 series, a line of notebook computers first released by Lenovo in 2012
- X1 Discovery a software company formerly known as X1 Technologies, Inc.
- Tegra X1, a system on a chip released by Nvidia in 2015
- X1, an IPTV-based cable television hardware platform developed by Comcast

== Arts, entertainment, and media ==
- X1 (band), a South Korean boy band formed through Produce X 101
- X1 (rapper) (1979–2007), American rapper
- X Minus One, a 1950s American radio show
- X-Men (film), the first film in the X-Men franchise
- X-One, monthly magazine produced by Imagine Publishing

== Other ==
- x^{−1}, the multiplicative inverse of x (another way to denote 1/x, one divided by x)
- United States patent X1, by Samuel Hopkins (inventor)
- X1 (Egyptian hieroglyph t), an extremely common alphabetic letter in the Ancient Egyptian alphabet
- X1, a former sister MMA promotion of the defunct Fighting of World Japan Pro Wrestling

== See also ==
- X-1 (disambiguation)
- 1X (disambiguation)
