= Anne Cowley =

American astronomer

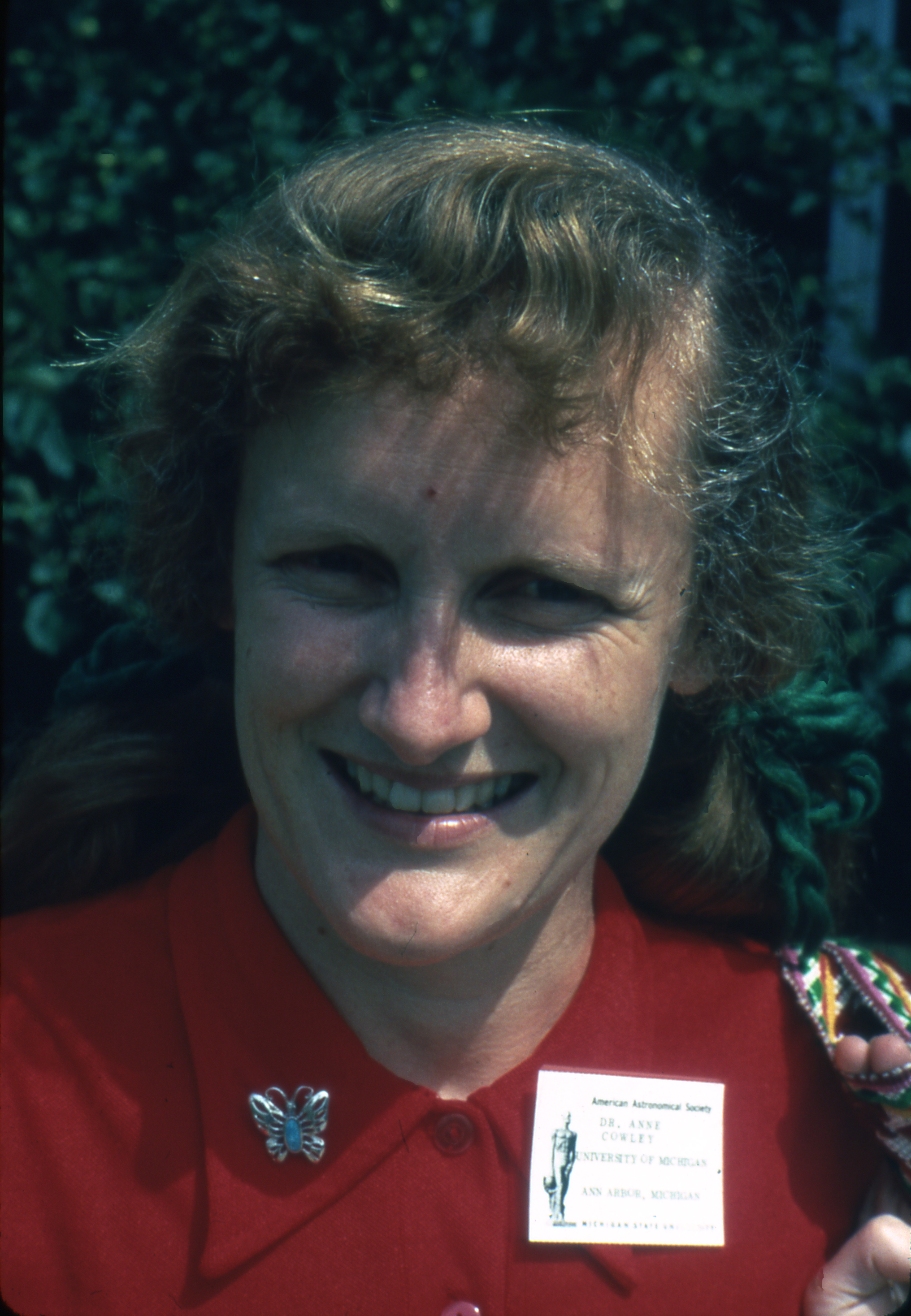
- Anne Cowley at the 138th Meeting of the American Astronomical Society (AAS), Michigan State University
- Education: Wellesley College; University of Michigan
- Known for: Spectroscopic observations of stars and stellar black holes
- Spouse: Charles R. Cowley
- Awards: Alumnae Achievement Award
- Scientific career
- Workplaces: University of Chicago; University of Michigan; Arizona State University

Anne Pyne Cowley is an American astronomer known for her spectroscopic observations of stars and stellar black holes, including the 1983 discovery of a likely black hole in LMC X-3, an X-ray binary star system in the Large Magellanic Cloud. This became the first known extragalactic stellar black hole, and the second known stellar black hole after Cygnus X-1. She is a professor emerita at Arizona State University.

== Education and career ==
Cowley is a 1959 graduate of Wellesley College, where she became interested in astronomy after taking a general education course on the subject. She went to the University of Michigan for graduate study in astronomy, earned a Ph.D. there, and met her eventual husband, astronomer Charles R. Cowley.

She continued as a researcher at the University of Chicago until 1967, when she returned to the University of Michigan as a research scientist. In 1983, she took a professorship at Arizona State University.

== Recognition ==
In 1986, Wellesley College gave Cowley their Alumnae Achievement Award. She was named a Legacy Fellow of the American Astronomical Society in 2020.
