= NGC 4313 =

Spiral galaxy in the constellation Virgo

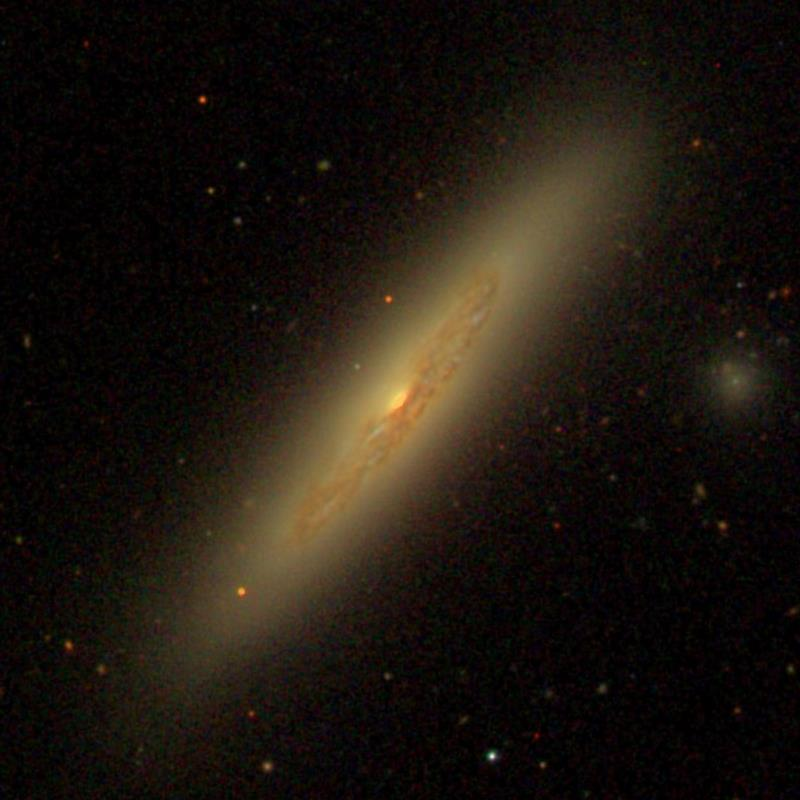
- SDSS image of NGC 4313.

Observation data (J2000 epoch)
- Constellation: Virgo
- Right ascension: 12^{h} 22^{m} 38.5^{s}
- Declination: 11° 48′ 03″
- Redshift: 0.004813
- Heliocentric radial velocity: 1443 km/s
- Distance: 47.1 Mly (14.45 Mpc)
- Group or cluster: Virgo Cluster
- Apparent magnitude (V): 12.5

Characteristics
- Type: SA(rs)ab
- Size: ~77,000 ly (23.7 kpc) (estimated)
- Apparent size (V): 4.99 x 0.79

Other designations
- UGC 07445, VCC 0570, PGC 040105, MCG +02-32-016

NGC 4313 is an edge-on spiral galaxy located about 50 million light-years away in the constellation Virgo. It was discovered by astronomer William Herschel on March 15, 1784. NGC 4313 is a member of the Virgo Cluster and is classified as LINER and as a Seyfert galaxy.

NGC 4313 has undergone ram-pressure stripping in the past.

== Black Hole ==
NGC 4313 may harbor an intermediate-mass black hole with an estimated mass of 200,000 (2*10^5) solar masses.

== See also ==
- List of NGC objects (4001–5000)
