= GW231123 =

Gravitational-wave event detected in 2023

- Event type: Gravitational wave
- Date: Detected 23 November 2023, 13:54:30 UTC
- Duration: 0.1 seconds
- Instrument: LIGO
- Distance: 2.2+1.9 −1.5 Gpc
- Redshift: 0.39+0.27 −0.24
- Progenitor type: Binary black hole

GW231123 was a gravitational wave detected by the two LIGO detectors on 23 November 2023. As of 2025, it is the largest binary black hole merger yet detected, at 225+26
−43 solar masses (M_{☉}) for the final object. One or both of the objects involved in the merger may have been in the upper black hole mass gap.

== Characteristics ==
GW231123 was the result of the merger of a 137+22
−17 M_{☉} black hole and a 103+20
−52 M_{☉} black hole creating a new intermediate-mass black hole. It occurred at an estimated distance of 2.2+1.9
−1.5 Gpc. The parent black holes have unusually large spins, with a magnitude of 0.9+0.10
−0.19 and 0.8+0.20
−0.51 for the two.

== Science results ==
The high mass of both components of the binary black hole raises questions on its formation, as some very massive stars are thought to undergo pair-instability supernova, which do not leave a remnant; this is thought to result in a gap in the black hole mass distribution between 60 and 130 M_{☉} (although there is some uncertainty on the limits). This suggests that the system has undergone a more complex process, e.g. with the black holes possibly resulting from earlier mergers, which is known as a "hierarchical" merger (this hypothesis is in particular supported by the high spins of the black holes).

As the signal is extremely short, it is also possible that the signal originates from another type of system, such as cosmic strings, although it is considered unlikely.
