= GRO J1719−24 =

Star in the constellation Ophiuchus

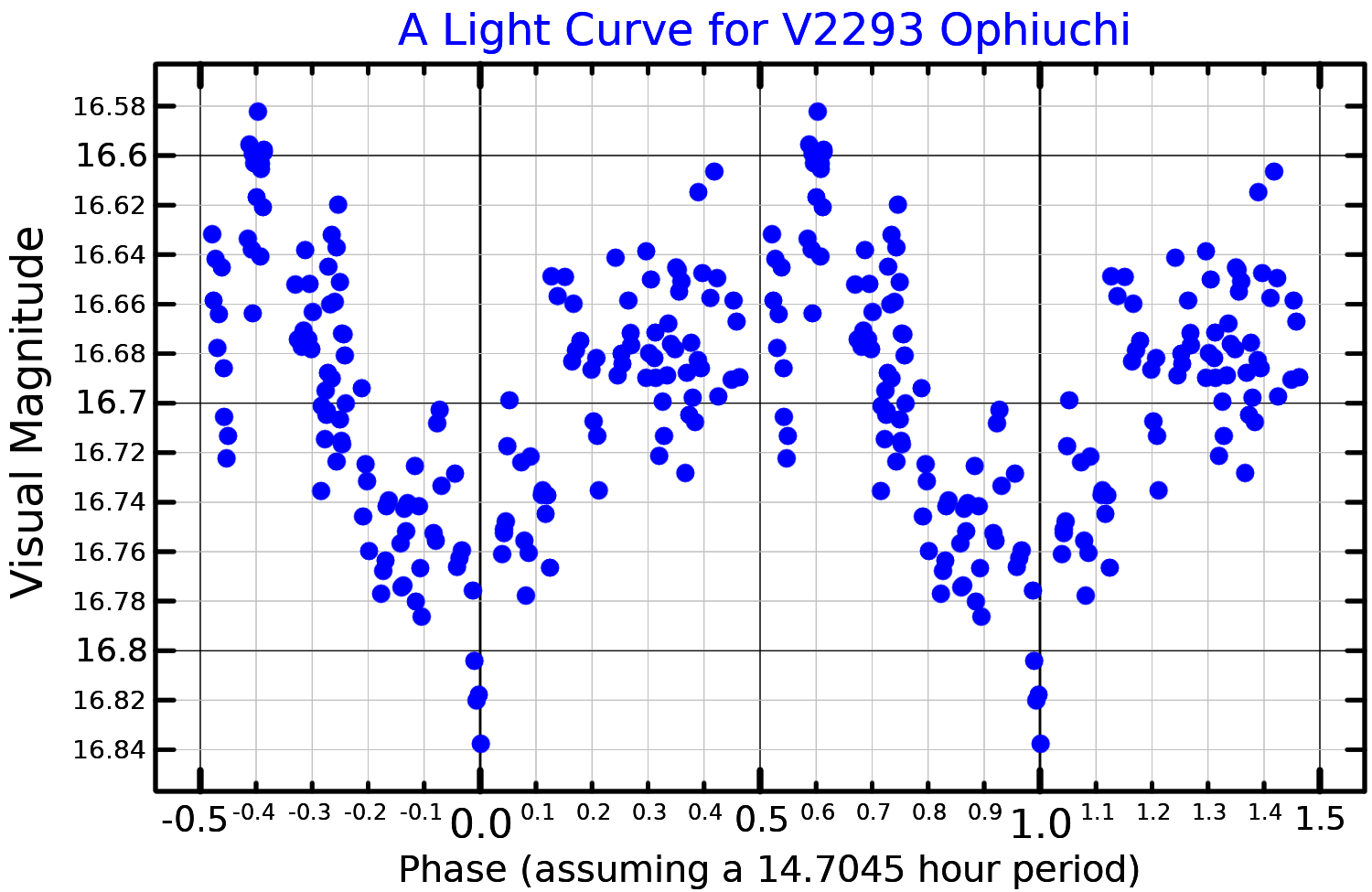
- A visual band light curve showing superhumps of V2293 Ophiuchi, adapted from Masetti et al. (1996)

Observation data Epoch J2000 Equinox ICRS
- Constellation: Ophiuchus
- Right ascension: 17^{h} 19^{m} 37^{s}
- Declination: −25° 01′ 03″
- Apparent magnitude (V): 16.65

Astrometry
Distance	8500 ly (2600 pc)
Absolute magnitude (M_{V})	≥6

Database references
SIMBAD	data

GRO J1719−24 (GRS 1716−249, V2293 Oph, X-Ray Nova Ophiuchi 1993) is believed to be a low-mass X-ray binary. Its name derives from an X-ray transient, detected in 1993. The system consists of a black hole candidate and a low mass companion, estimated to be a main sequence star of the spectral type K0-5 V.

The rotation period is uncertain, estimated at 14.7h. The light curve possibly exhibits some faster fluctuations as well, which are hypothesized to be produced by blobs of matter in the accretion disk.
