= GCIRS 13E =

Infrared and radio emitting object near the Galactic Center

Observation data Epoch J2000.0 Equinox ICRS
- Constellation: Sagittarius
- Right ascension: 17^{h} 45^{m} 39.73^{s}
- Declination: −29° 00′ 29.7″
| Distance | 26,000 ly (8,000 pc) |

Other designations
- WR 101f

Database references
| SIMBAD | data |

GCIRS 13E is an infrared and radio object near the Galactic Center. It is believed to be a cluster of hot massive stars, possibly containing an intermediate-mass black hole (IMBH) at its center.

GCIRS 13E was first identified as GCIRS 13, which was later resolved into two components GCIRS13E and W. GCIRS 13E was initially modelled as a single object, possibly a binary system. It was even classified as a Wolf–Rayet star because of its strong emission line spectrum, and named WR 101f. It was then resolved into seven Wolf–Rayet and class O stars. The highest-resolution infrared imaging and spectroscopy can now identify 19 objects in GCIRS 13E, of which 15 are dense gaseous regions. The remaining four objects are stars: WN8 and WC9 Wolf–Rayet stars; an OB supergiant; and a K3 giant.

The motions of the members of GCIRS 13E appear to indicate a much higher mass than can be accounted for by the visible objects. It has been proposed that there may be an intermediate-mass black hole with a mass of about 1,300 M_{☉} at its center. There are a number of problems with this theory. However, the true nature of the cluster remains unknown.

GCIRS 13E is a small cluster dominated by a few massive stars. It is thought that massive stars cannot form so close to a supermassive black hole and since such massive stars have a short lifespan it is thought that GCIRS 13E must have migrated inward toward the central black hole within the past 10 million years, probably from about 60 light-years further out than its current orbit. The stars are possibly the remains of a globular cluster where a middleweight black hole could develop through runaway star collisions. GCIRS 13E could also be a dark star cluster which forms in the inner Galaxy if the evaporation rate of stars from the cluster is faster due to a strong tidal field than the depletion of the black hole content though ejections.
