= LMC X-3 =

X-ray binary in the Large Magellanic Cloud

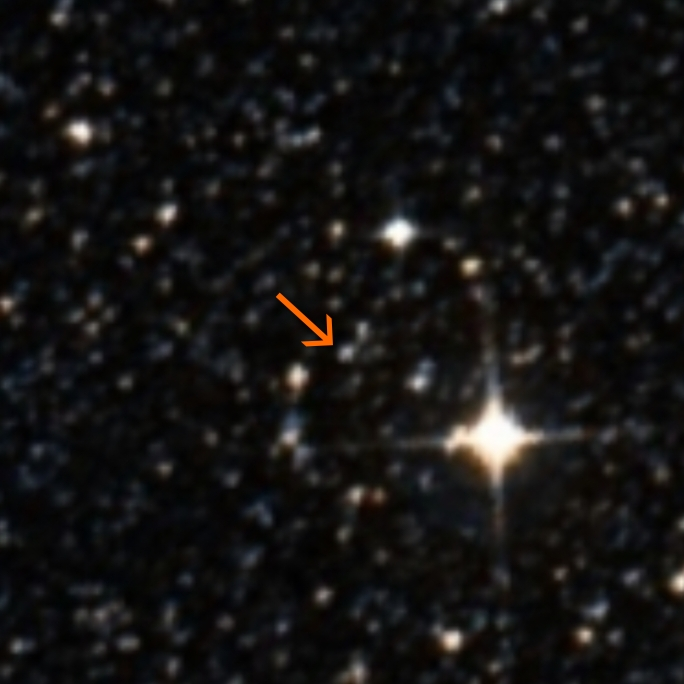
- Location of LMC X-3 from ESASky (pointed in red).

Observation data Epoch J2000 Equinox J2000
- Constellation: Dorado
- Right ascension: 05^{h} 38^{m} 56^{s}
- Declination: −64° 05′ 03″
- Apparent magnitude (V): 16.7

Characteristics
- Evolutionary stage: Main-sequence (A); Black hole (B)
- Spectral type: BH + B2.5Ve

Astrometry
Distance	165,000 ly (50,589 pc)

Orbit
Primary	main-sequence star
Name	black hole
Period (P)	1.70481 days
Semi-major axis (a)	11000000 km
Eccentricity (e)	0.22 ± 0.4
Inclination (i)	69.8° ± 0.84°
Semi-amplitude (K_{2}) (secondary)	256.7 ± 4.9 km/s

Details

A
Mass	3.63 ± 0.57 M_{☉}
Radius	4.4 R_{☉}

B
Mass	6.98 ± 0.56 M_{☉}

Other designations
- LMC X-3, RX J0538.9-6405, 2MAXI J0539-640, 2XMM J053856.5-640503, Gaia DR3 4757068874690668160

Database references
SIMBAD	data

LMC X-3 is a high-mass X-ray binary (HMXB) system located in the Large Magellanic Cloud (LMC), a satellite galaxy of the Milky Way approximately 165,000 light-years (50.5 kiloparsecs) away. The system consists of a stellar-mass black hole accreting material from a B-type main-sequence companion star, producing intense X-ray emission via a hot accretion disk. LMC X-3 is one of the most studied extragalactic black hole binaries due to its brightness and variability.

== Discovery ==
=== Black hole ===
LMC X-3 was first identified in 1971 by the Uhuru satellites led by Leong et al. and discovered as a bright X-ray source in the Large Magellanic Cloud. This was identified as a black hole in 1983 by Anne Cowley et al. using dynamic observations along with the companion B-star.

=== Star ===
The companion of the LMC X-3 black hole was located on 1975 by P. R. Warren and J. E. Penfold when they saw an optical counterpart as a OB star in the X-ray error circle. In 1983, this was confirmed by Cowley et al. by using spectral and spectroscopic observation of LMC X-3. It has been called Warren and Penfold's star or the WP star.

== Characteristics ==
LMC X-3 comprises a black hole and a B-type companion star, classified as B2.5Ve. The companion, with a surface temperature significantly hotter than the Sun’s, transfers mass to the black hole via Roche-lobe overflow, forming an accretion disk that emits X-rays up to 10,000 times the Sun’s total luminosity.

=== Orbital Parameters ===
The system has an orbital period of approximately 1.70481 days, with a separation of about 7 million miles (11 million kilometers). The orbit is inclined at 68° (+2°/−3°), preventing eclipses. The companion’s radial velocity semi-amplitude is 256.7 ± 4.9 km/s, yielding a mass function of ~2.3 solar masses. Optical light curves show double-humped profiles due to the companion’s ellipsoidal distortion.

=== Variability ===
LMC X-3 is notable for its persistent yet highly variable nature, often remaining in soft spectral states dominated by thermal disk emission, making it ideal for testing accretion disk models. It exhibits long-term intensity variations on 100–300 day timescales and enters anomalous low states (ALS) lasting 80+ days, during which X-ray and UV brightness drops significantly, with reduced variability. These ALS events, observed multiple times, are likely driven by changes in mass accretion rate from the companion, with X-ray lags of about 8 days during state transitions. The inner disk radius remains remarkably constant across observations, supporting reliable spin measurements via continuum fitting.

=== Spin and polarization ===
The black hole's spin parameter is low, estimated at ~0.2 using X-ray continuum fitting. In 2023, IXPE detected X-ray polarization with a polarization degree of 3.2% ± 0.6% and a polarization angle of −42° ± 6° in the 2–8 keV band, setting an upper spin limit of a < 0.7 at 90% confidence. Polarization increases slightly with energy, consistent with other soft-state black hole binaries. Simultaneous NICER and NuSTAR observations confirmed the soft-state nature and spin estimates.

== Formation and Evolution ==
Evolutionary models suggest LMC X-3 formed from a zero-age main-sequence binary, evolving through a supernova explosion of the primary star, with the current phase involving stable mass transfer. Its proximity to the transient/persistent divide among black hole X-ray binaries makes it a key system for understanding accretion physics and black hole formation in low-metallicity environments like the LMC.

== See also ==
- LMC X-1
