= Onex =

One-X, a 2006 album by Three Days Grace

Onex or OneX or variation may mean:

- Onex, Switzerland, a city in the canton of Geneva
- Onex Corporation, a Canadian investment firm
- Sonex Aircraft Onex, a homebuilt aircraft undergoing development
- Xbox One X
- HTC One X smartphone

== See also ==
- 1X (disambiguation)
