= GW190814 =

Gravitational wave of a "mass gap" collision

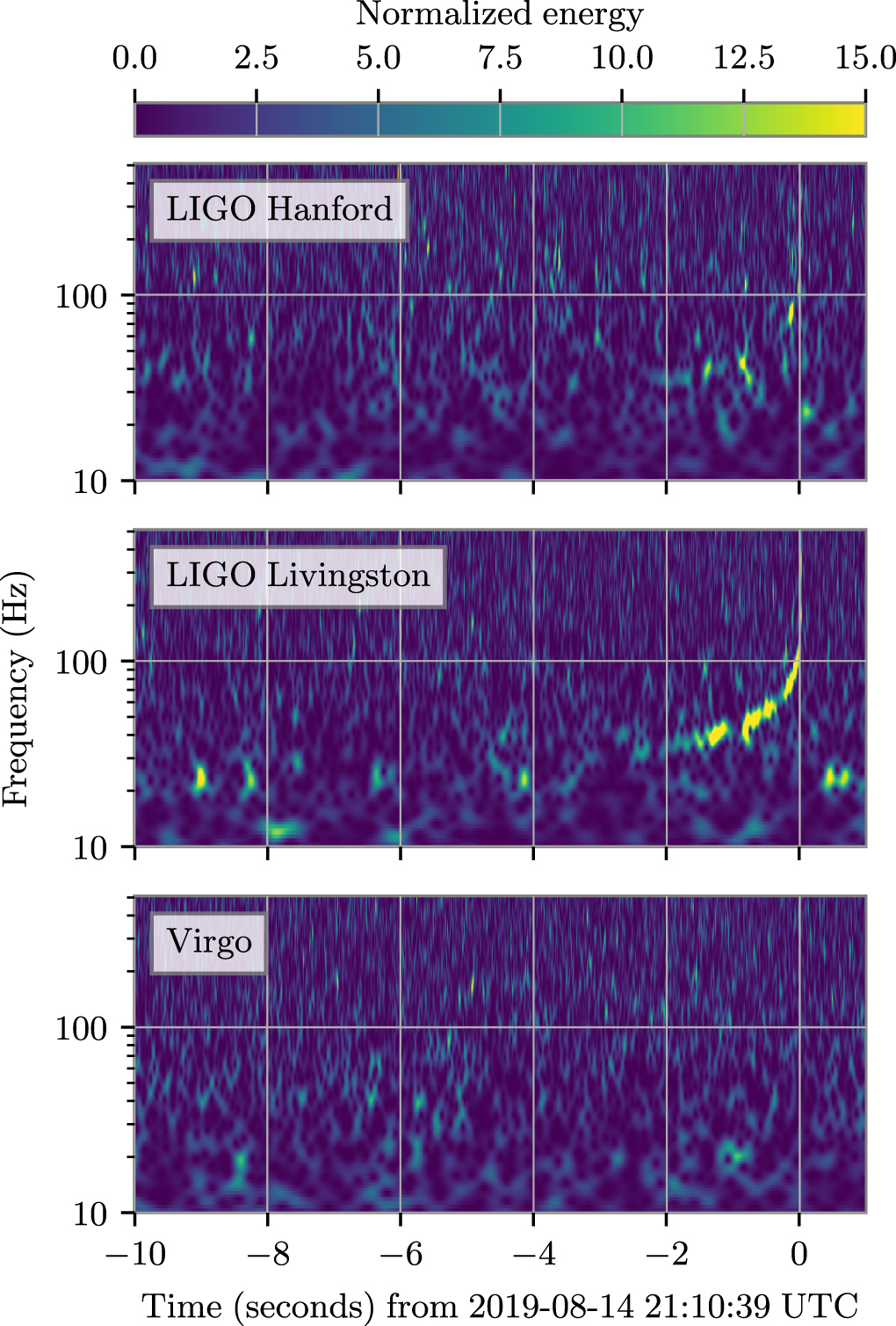
- Time–frequency representations (Chatterji et al. 2004) of data containing GW190814, observed by LIGO Hanford (top), LIGO Livingston (middle), and Virgo (bottom). Times are shown relative to 2019 August 14, 21:10:39 UTC. Each detector's data are whitened by their respective noise amplitude spectral density and a Q-transform is calculated. The colorbar displays the normalized energy reported by the Q-transform at each frequency. These plots are not used in our detection procedure and are for visualization purposes only.
- Gravitational wave
- Date: 21:10:39 UTC
- Instrument: LIGO, Virgo
- Distance: 241 megaparsecs (790 Mly)
- Other designations: GW190814
- Related media on Commons

GW 190814 was a gravitational wave (GW) signal observed by the LIGO and Virgo detectors on 14 August 2019 at 21:10:39 UTC, and having a signal-to-noise ratio of 25 in the three-detector network. The signal was associated with the astronomical super event S190814bv, located 790 million light years away, in location area 18.5 deg^{2} (Note: The relatively large and distant area of the sky within which it is claimed to be possible to localize the source.) towards Sculptor. No optical counterpart was discovered despite an extensive search of the probability region.

== Discovery ==
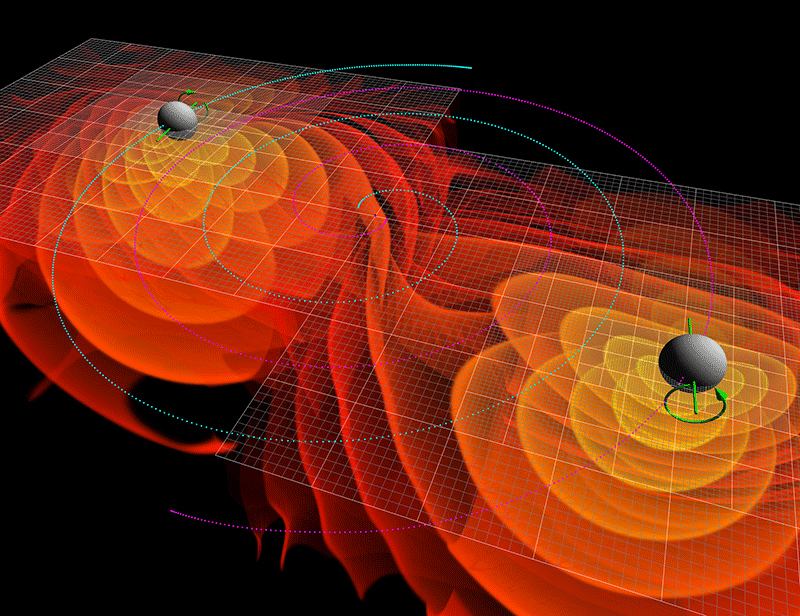
Simulated example of two black holes merging.

In June 2020, astronomers reported details of a compact binary merging, in the "mass gap" of cosmic collisions, of a first-ever 2.50–2.67 M_{☉} "mystery object", either an extremely heavy neutron star (that was theorized not to exist) or a too-light black hole, with a 22.2–24.3 M_{☉} black hole, that was detected as the gravitational wave GW190814.

"We don't know if this object is the heaviest known neutron star or the lightest known black hole, but either way it breaks a record."

— Vicky Kalogera, professor at Northwestern University.

The mass of the lighter component is estimated to be 2.6 times the mass of the Sun (M_{☉} ≈ 1.9891×10^{30} kg), placing it in the aforementioned mass gap between neutron stars and black holes.

Despite an intensive search, no optical counterpart to the gravitational wave was observed. The lack of emitted light could be consistent with either a situation in which a black hole entirely consumed a neutron star or the merger of two black holes.

== See also ==
- Gravitational-wave astronomy
- List of gravitational wave observations
- Multi-messenger astronomy
