= CO−0.40−0.22 =

Molecular cloud

Molecular cloud

Observation data: J2000 epoch
- Right ascension: 17^{h} 45.5^{m}
- Declination: −29° 24′
- Distance: 27000 ly (8300 pc)
- Constellation: Sagittarius

CO−0.40−0.22 is a high velocity compact gas cloud near the centre of the Milky Way. It is 200 light years away from the centre in the central molecular zone. The cloud is in the shape of ellipse. The differences in the velocity, termed velocity dispersion, of the gas is unusually high at 100 km/s.

The velocity dispersion was once thought to be due to an intermediate-mass black hole (IMBH) with a mass of about 100,000 solar masses. However, observations with the Atacama Large Millimeter/submillimeter Array suggested the evidence for a cloud-cloud collision. Subsequent theoretical studies of the gas cloud and nearby IMBH candidates have re-opened the possibility, though no observational evidence for existence of an IMBH has been reported.

The molecular cloud has a mass of 4,000 solar masses. It is located at −0.40°, −0.22° galactic longitude and latitude. The cloud is 0.2° away from Sgr C to the galactic southeast. The gas is moving away from Earth at speeds ranging from 20 to 120 km/s. The spectral lines of carbon monoxide reveal that the gas is dense, and warm and fairly opaque.

The gas cloud includes carbon monoxide and hydrogen cyanide molecules. Other molecules detected via microwave spectroscopy include cyanoacetylene, cyclopropenylidene, methanol, silicon monoxide, sulfur monoxide, carbon monosulfide, Thioformaldehyde, Hydrogen isocyanide, Formamide, and ions H_{2}N^{+} and HCO^{+}.

The name followed the precedent set by CO−0.02−0.02, which is another high velocity compact cloud in the central molecular zone. Another example of this naming convention is CO−0.30−0.07.
