= Yamaha X-1R =

Commuter motorbike

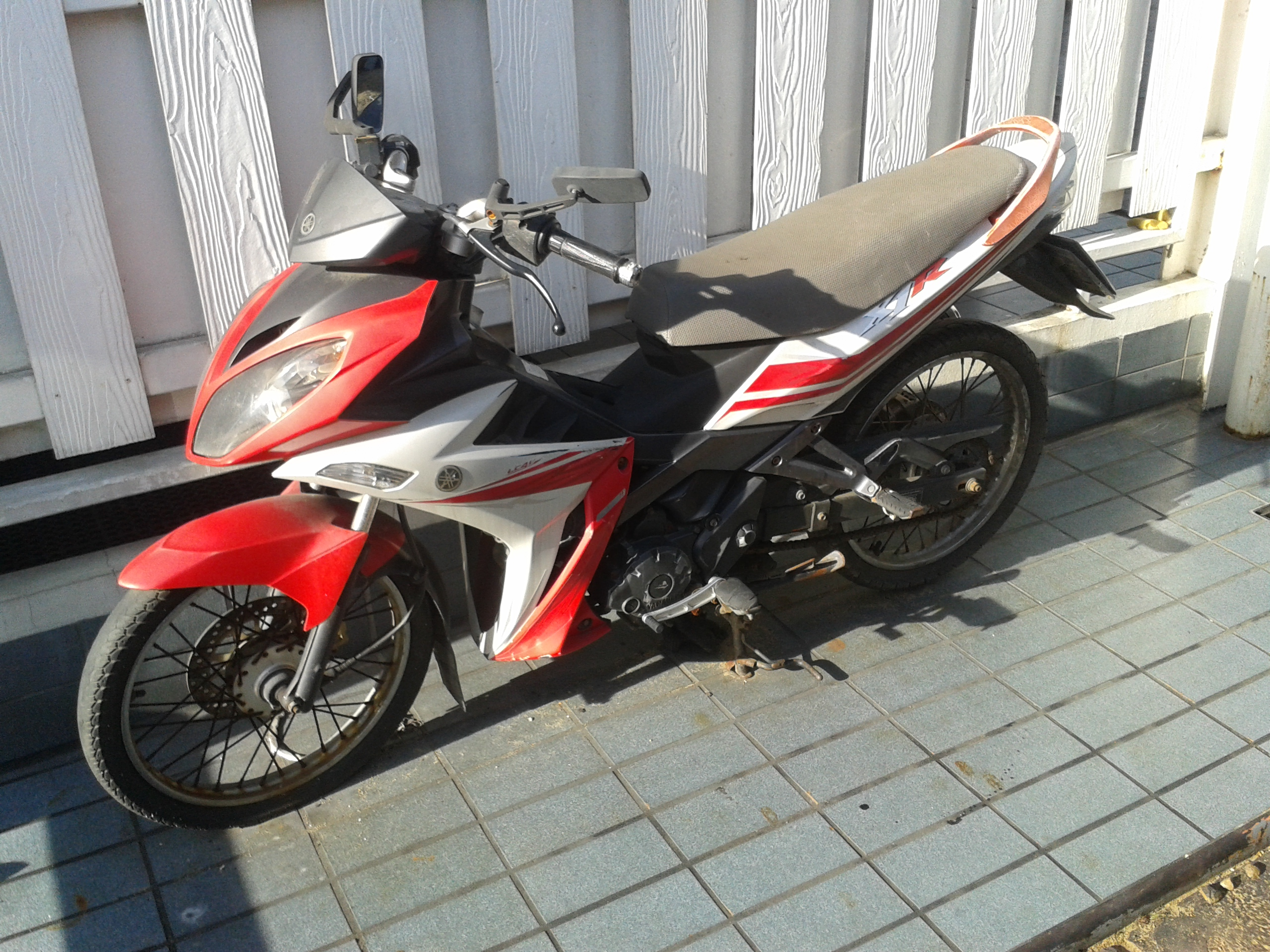
X-1R

The Yamaha X-1R is a commuter motorbike built by Yamaha Motors. It is similar to a Yamaha X-1, but replaces that model's 110 cc engine with a larger 135 cc engine. It is almost exactly similar with the Yamaha Sniper/T135 except for several distinguishable features, such as:

- Body styling & fairings
- Engine & swing arm color (black)
- Headlight assembly
- Instrument panel
- Transmission (1 down, 3 up)
- Movable foot pegs
- Tail light assembly
- Bent side mirrors
- Clip-on handlebars
- Dual piston front disc brakes
- Rear disc brakes
- Kick starter rubber

== Specifications ==
Engine
Form	4-stroke SOHC single cylinder with liquid cooling 4 valves
displacement	134.4 cm^{3} (8.20 cu in)
Compression ratio	10.9 : 1
Cylinder	54.0 mm (2.13 in) bore x 58.7 mm (2.31 in) stroke
Fuel system	Carburetor
Clutch	Hand clutch wet multi-plate clutch hands overlap
Transmission	Sports gear A level 4 (1 down, 4 up)
Fuel tank capacity	4.0 L (1.1 US gal)
Carriage
Dimensions	670 mm (26 in) wide x 1,945 mm (76.6 in) long x 1,020 mm (40 in) high
Weight (minus fuel)	105 kg (231 lb)
Suspension
Front	Telescopic spring/oil damped
Rear	Swing single shock (mono Cross)
Brakes
Front	Dual piston disc
Rear	disc
Tires
Front	70/90 – 17 M/C 33P
Rear	80/90 – 17 M/C 44P
