= IC 10 X-1 =

High-mass X-ray binary

Observation data Epoch J2000 Equinox ICRS
- Constellation: Cassiopeia
- Right ascension: 00^{h} 20^{m} 29.03310480^{s}
- Declination: +59° 16′ 51.7609560″

Details

Black hole
Mass	24-33 M_{☉}

Wolf-Rayet star
Mass	>17 M_{☉}

Orbit
Period (P)	35 hours

IC 10 X-1 is an X-ray source located in the dwarf galaxy IC 10, an irregular galaxy. It corresponds to a high-mass X-ray binary in which the normal star is a Wolf–Rayet star and the compact object is a stellar black hole. The mass of this black hole makes it one of the most massive objects of this class known to date. It is also the first detected Wolf–Rayet star–black hole system; a second system was discovered shortly afterwards (NGC 300 X-1).

== Discovery ==
IC 10 X-1 was discovered using the artificial satellite ROSAT in 1997. Its optical counterpart was identified as a Wolf–Rayet star in 2004. Modulation of the emitted X-ray flux was detected with the artificial satellite Swift in 2006, indicating an orbital period of about 35 hours for this system. This information, combined with the measurement of the radial velocity of the companion star determined by spectroscopy, made it possible to determine the mass function of the system, equal to 7.8 solar masses, corresponding to the lower limit on the mass of the companion to the star. Such a value is far above the maximum mass of a neutron star, proving with certainty that the companion is a black hole. In reality, the mass of the black hole appears to be significantly greater than the lower limit of 7.8 solar masses, due to the large mass of the Wolf–Rayet star. The latter is considered to have at least 17 solar masses, and a value of 35 solar masses has been proposed based on spectroscopic data for this star. The mass of the black hole derived from these values is estimated to be between 24 and 33 solar masses.

The distance between the star and the black hole appears too large for the star to completely fill its Roche lobe. Therefore, matter escapes not because the star is too large or too close to the black hole, but because it is the site of a strong stellar wind.

== See also ==
- Binary mass function
