= Stellar black hole =

Black hole formed by a collapsed star

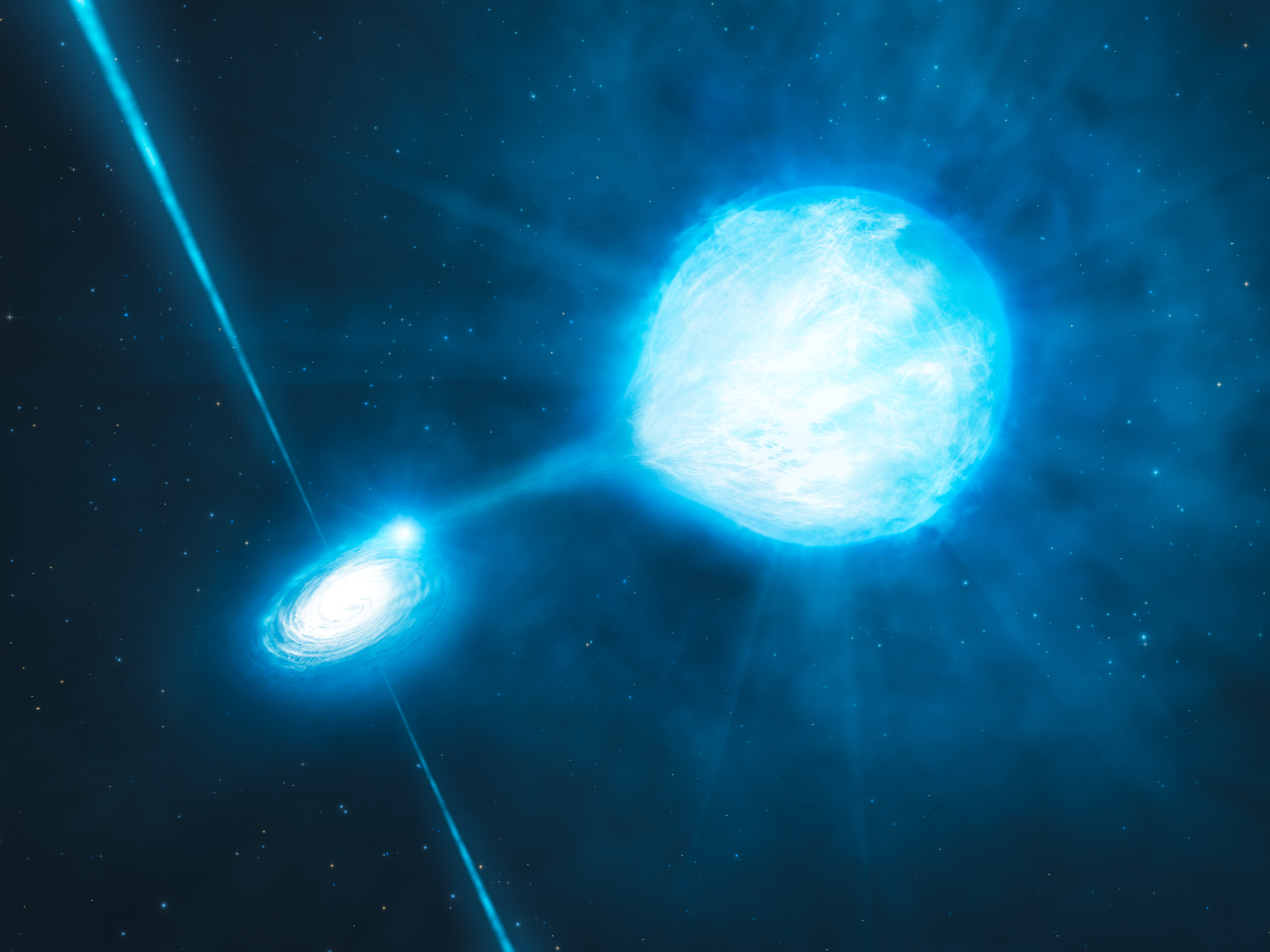
Artist's impression of a stellar-mass black hole (left) in the spiral galaxy NGC 300; it is associated with a Wolf–Rayet star

A stellar black hole (or stellar-mass black hole) is a black hole formed by the gravitational collapse of a star. They have masses ranging from about five to several tens of solar masses. They can be the remnants of supernova explosions, but other formation mechanisms may operate.

== Properties ==
By the no-hair theorem, a black hole can only have three fundamental properties: mass, electric charge, and angular momentum. The angular momentum of a stellar black hole is due to the conservation of angular momentum of the star or objects that produced it.

The gravitational collapse of a star is inevitable at the end of the life of a massive star, when all stellar energy sources are exhausted. If the mass of the collapsing part of the star is below the Chandrasekhar limit, a white dwarf results. If the mass is higher but below the Tolman–Oppenheimer–Volkoff (TOV) limit for neutron-degenerate matter, the end product is a neutron star. If the collapsing star has a mass exceeding the TOV limit, the crush will continue until a black hole is formed. These limits for the formation of compact stars are approximate and may vary depending on the chemical composition and spin of the star.

The maximum mass that a neutron star can possess before further collapsing into a black hole is not fully understood. In 1939, it was estimated at 0.7 solar masses, called the TOV limit. In 1996, a different estimate put this upper mass in a range from 1.5 to 3 solar masses. The maximum observed mass of neutron stars is about 2.14 M_{☉} for PSR J0740+6620 discovered in September 2019.

In the theory of general relativity, a black hole could exist of any mass. The lower the mass, the higher the density of matter has to be in order to form a black hole. (See, for example, the discussion in Schwarzschild radius, the radius of a black hole.) There are no known stellar processes that can produce black holes with mass less than a few times the mass of the Sun. If black holes that small exist, they are most likely primordial black holes. Until 2016, the largest known stellar black hole was 15.65±1.45 solar masses. In September 2015, a rotating black hole of 62±4 solar masses was discovered by gravitational waves as it formed in a merger event of two smaller black holes. As of June 2020, the binary system 2MASS J05215658+4359220 was reported to host the smallest-mass black hole currently known to science, with a mass 3.3 solar masses and a diameter of only 19.5 kilometers.

There is observational evidence for two other types of black holes, which are much more massive than stellar black holes. They are intermediate-mass black holes (in the center of globular clusters) and supermassive black holes in the center of the Milky Way and other galaxies.

== X-ray compact binary systems ==
Stellar black holes in close binary systems are observable when the matter is transferred from a companion star to the black hole; the energy released in the fall toward the compact star is so large that the matter heats up to temperatures of several hundred million degrees and radiates in X-rays. The black hole, therefore, is observable in X-rays, whereas the companion star can be observed with optical telescopes. The energy release for black holes and neutron stars are of the same order of magnitude. Black holes and neutron stars are therefore often difficult to distinguish.

The derived masses come from observations of compact X-ray sources (combining X-ray and optical data). All identified neutron stars have a mass below 3.0 solar masses; none of the compact systems with a mass above 3.0 solar masses display the properties of a neutron star. The combination of these facts makes it more and more likely that the class of compact stars with a mass above 3.0 solar masses are in fact black holes.

Note that this proof of the existence of stellar black holes is not entirely observational but relies on theory: we can think of no other object for these massive compact systems in stellar binaries besides a black hole. A direct proof of the existence of a black hole would be if one actually observes the orbit of a particle (or a cloud of gas) that falls into the black hole.

== Black hole kicks ==
The large distances above the galactic plane achieved by some binaries are the result of black hole natal kicks. The velocity distribution of black hole natal kicks seems similar to that of neutron star kick velocities. One might have expected that it would be the momenta that were the same with black holes receiving lower velocity than neutron stars due to their higher mass but that doesn't seem to be the case, which may be due to the fall-back of asymmetrically expelled matter increasing the momentum of the resulting black hole.

== Mass gaps ==
It is predicted by some models of stellar evolution that black holes with masses in two ranges cannot be directly formed by the gravitational collapse of a star. These are sometimes distinguished as the "lower" and "upper" mass gaps, roughly representing the ranges of 2 to 5 and 50 to 150 solar masses (M_{☉}), respectively. Another range given for the upper gap is 52 to 133 M_{☉}. 150 M_{☉} has been regarded as the upper mass limit for stars in the current era of the universe.

=== Lower mass gap ===
A lower mass gap is suspected on the basis of a scarcity of observed candidates with masses within a few solar masses above the maximum possible neutron star mass. The existence and theoretical basis for this possible gap are uncertain. The situation may be complicated by the fact that any black holes found in this mass range may have been created via the merging of binary neutron star systems, rather than stellar collapse. The LIGO/Virgo collaboration has reported three candidate events among their gravitational wave observations in run O3 with component masses that fall in this lower mass gap. There has also been reported an observation of a bright, rapidly rotating giant star in a binary system with an unseen companion emitting no light, including x-rays, but having a mass of 3.3+2.8
−0.7 solar masses. This is interpreted to suggest that there may be many such low-mass black holes that are not currently consuming any material and are hence undetectable via the usual x-ray signature.

=== Upper mass gap ===
The upper mass gap is predicted by comprehensive models of late-stage stellar evolution. It is expected that with increasing mass, supermassive stars reach a stage where a pair-instability supernova occurs, during which pair production, the production of free electrons and positrons in the collision between atomic nuclei and energetic gamma rays, temporarily reduces the internal pressure supporting the star's core against gravitational collapse. This pressure drop leads to a partial collapse, which in turn causes greatly accelerated burning in a runaway thermonuclear explosion, resulting in the star being blown completely apart without leaving a stellar remnant behind.

Pair-instability supernovae can only happen in stars with a mass range from around 130 to 250 solar masses (M_{☉}) and low to moderate metallicity (low abundance of elements other than hydrogen and helium – a situation common in Population III stars). However, this mass gap is expected to be extended down to about 45 solar masses by the process of pair-instability pulsational mass loss, before the occurrence of a "normal" supernova explosion and core collapse. In nonrotating stars the lower bound of the upper mass gap may be as high as 60 M_{☉}. The possibility of direct collapse into black holes of stars with core mass > 133 M_{☉}, requiring total stellar mass of > 260 M_{☉} has been considered, but there may be little chance of observing such a high-mass supernova remnant; i.e., the lower bound of the upper mass gap may represent a mass cutoff.

Observations of the LB-1 system of a star and unseen companion were initially interpreted in terms of a black hole with a mass of about 70 solar masses, which would be excluded by the upper mass gap. However, further investigations have weakened this claim.

Black holes may also be found in the mass gap through mechanisms other than those involving a single star, such as the merger of black holes.

== Candidates ==
The Milky Way galaxy contains several stellar-mass black hole candidates (BHCs) which are closer to the Solar System than the supermassive black hole in the galactic center region. Most of these candidates are members of X-ray binary systems in which the compact object draws matter from its partner via an accretion disk. The probable black holes in these pairs range from three to more than a dozen solar masses.

Name	Mass (solar masses)		Orbital period (days)	Distance from Earth (ly)	Celestial Coordinates
Name	BHC	Companion	Orbital period (days)	Distance from Earth (ly)	Celestial Coordinates
Gaia BH3	32.70 ± 0.82	0.76 ± 0.05	4,253.1 ± 98.5	1926	19:39:19 +14:55:54
Cyg X-1	21.2 ± 2.2	40.6+7.7 −7.1	5.6	6000...8000	19:58:22 +35:12:06
GRS 1915+105/V1487 Aql	14 ± 4.0	≈1	33.5	40000	19:15:12 +10:56:44
V404 Cyg	12 ± 2	6.0	6.5	7800 ± 460	20:24:04 +33:52:03
A0620-00/V616 Mon	11 ± 2	2.6–2.8	0.33	3500	06:22:44 −00:20:45
XTE J1650-500	9.7 ± 1.6	5–10	0.32	10763	16:50:01 −49:57:45
Gaia BH1	9.62 ± 0.18	0.93 ± 0.05	185.59 ± 0.05	1560	17:28:41 −00:34:52
XTE J1550-564/V381 Nor	9.6 ± 1.2	6.0...7.5	1.5	17000	15:50:59 −56:28:36
4U 1543-475/IL Lupi	9.4 ± 1.0	0.25	1.1	24000	15:47:09 −47:40:10
Gaia BH2	8.94 ± 0.34	1.07 ± 0.19	1,276.7 ± 0.6	3800	13:50:17 −59:14:20
MAXI J1305-704	8.9+1.6 −1.0	0.43 ± 0.16	0.394 ± 0.004	24500	13:06:55 −70:27:05
GS 1354-64 (BW Cir)	7.9 ± 0.5	1.1 ± 0.1	2.5445	>81500	13:58:10 −64:44:06
XTE J1859+226 (V406 Vul)	7.8 ± 1.9	0.55 ± 0.16	0.276 ± 0.003		18:58:42 +22:39:29
HD 130298	>7.7 ± 1.5	24.2 ± 3.8	14.60	7910	14:49:34 −56:25:38
NGC 3201 #21859	7.68 ± 0.50	0.61 ± 0.05	2.2422 ± 0.0001	15700	10:17:39 −46:24:25
GS 2000+25/QZ Vul	7.5 ± 0.3	4.9...5.1	0.35	8800	20:02:50 +25:14:11
XTE J1819-254/V4641 Sgr	7.1 ± 0.3	5...8	2.82	24000...40000	18:19:22 −25:24:25
LB-1 (disputed)	7 ± 2	1.5 ± 0.4	78.7999 ± 0.0097	15000	06:11:49 +22:49:32
GRS 1124-683/Nova Muscae 1991/GU Mus	7.0 ± 0.6		0.43	17000	11:26:27 −68:40:32
H 1705-25/Nova Ophiuchi 1977/V2107 Oph	6.95 ± 1.35	0.34 ± 0.08	0.52125		17:08:15 −25:05:30
XTE J1118+480/KV UMa	6.8 ± 0.4	6...6.5	0.17	6200	11:18:11 +48:02:13
MAXI J1820+070	6.75+0.64 −0.46	0.49 ± 0.1	0.68549 ± 0.00001	9800	18:20:22 +07:11:07
GRO J1655-40/V1033 Sco	6.3 ± 0.3	2.6...2.8	2.8	5000...11000	16:54:00 −39:50:45
GX 339-4/V821 Ara	5.8	5...6	1.75	15000	17:02:50 −48:47:23
GRO J1719-24	≥4.9	≈1.6	possibly 0.6	8500	17:19:37 −25:01:03
NGC 3201 #12560	4.53 ± 0.21	0.81 ± 0.05	167.01 ± 0.09	15700	10:17:37 −46:24:55
GRS 1009-45 / Nova Velorum 1993/MM Velorum	4.3 ± 0.1	0.5...0.65	0.285206 ± 0.0000014	17200	10:13:36 −45:04:33
GRO J0422+32/V518 Per	4 ± 1	1.1	0.21	8500	04:21:43 +32:54:27

=== Extragalactic ===
Candidates outside our galaxy come from gravitational wave detections:

Outside our galaxy
Name	BHC mass (solar masses)	Companion mass (solar masses )	Orbital period (days)	Distance from Earth (light years)	Location
GW190521 (155+17 −11) M_{☉}	78+9 −5	78+9 −5			
GW150914 (62 ± 4) M_{☉}	36 ± 4	29 ± 4	.	1.3 billion	
GW170104 (48.7 ± 5) M_{☉}	31.2 ± 7	19.4 ± 6	.	1.4 billion	
GW170814 (53.2+3.2 −2.5) M_{☉}	30.5+5.7 −3.0	25.3+2.8 −4.2		1.8 billion	
GW190412	29.7	8.4		2.4 billion	
GW190814	22.2–24.3	2.50–2.67			
GW151226 (21.8 ± 3.5) M_{☉}	14.2 ± 6	7.5 ± 2.3	.	2.9 billion	
GW170608	12+7 −2	7 ± 2		1.1 billion	

Candidates outside our galaxy from X-ray binaries:

Name	Host galaxy	BHC mass (solar masses)	Companion mass (solar masses )	Orbital period (days)	Distance from Earth (light years)
IC 10 X-1	IC 10	≥23.1 ± 2.1	≥17	1.45175	2.15 million
NGC 300 X-1	NGC 300	17 ± 4	26+7 −5	1.3663375	6.5 million
M33 X-7	Triangulum Galaxy	15.65 ± 1.45	70 ± 6.9	3.45301 ± 0.00002	2.7 million
LMC X-1	Large Magellanic Cloud	10.91 ± 1.41	31.79 ± 3.48	3.9094 ± 0.0008	180,000
LMC X-3	Large Magellanic Cloud	6.98 ± 0.56	3.63 ± 0.57	1.704808	157,000

The disappearance of N6946-BH1 following a failed supernova in NGC 6946 may have resulted in the formation of a black hole.

== See also ==
- Black holes in fiction
- Rogue black hole
- Primordial black hole
