= X1 Glasgow–Hamilton =

Bus route in Scotland

X1 is a bus route between Hamilton and Glasgow. It is operated by JMB Travel and previously First Glasgow.

== History ==
In September 2019, First announced plans to withdraw the route on 27 October. The company claimed passenger numbers had been falling for several years and blamed this on factors including increased journey times as a result of congestion on the M74 motorway which made the bus less attractive when compared to competing rail services. The decision led to criticism from local MPs and MSPs.

In October 2019, First announced that the service would continue for "three to four months". In January 2020, the company stated that passenger numbers were "lower than ever". In February 2020, First announced that it would continue running the service as it had seen a rise in usage following the introduction of marketing and branded buses.

The route was suspended during the COVID-19 pandemic and in July 2020 First announced that it would be withdrawn. The company stated that since its reintroduction the route had not carried enough passengers to be viable, despite an advertising campaign publicising its launch.

Prior to the 2022 Scottish local elections, various candidates have called for the service to be reinstated.

From 13 January 2025, the service will be reinstated by JMB Travel.
