= Intermediate-mass black hole =

Class of black holes with a mass range of 100 to 100000 solar masses

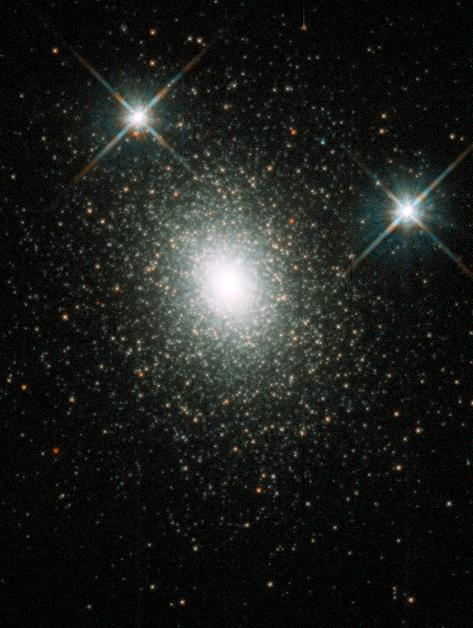
Globular cluster Mayall II (M31 G1) is a possible candidate for hosting an intermediate-mass black hole at its center

An intermediate-mass black hole (IMBH) is a class of black hole with mass in the range of 100 to 100,000 (10^{2}–10^{5}) solar masses: significantly higher than stellar black holes but lower than the hundred thousand to more than one billion (10^{5}–10^{9}) solar mass supermassive black holes. Several IMBH candidate objects have been discovered in the Milky Way galaxy and others nearby, based on indirect gas cloud velocity and accretion disk spectra observations of various evidentiary strength.

== Observational evidence ==
The gravitational wave signal GW190521, which occurred on 21 May 2019 at 03:02:29 UTC, and was published on 2 September 2020, resulted from the merger of two black holes. They had masses of 85 and 65 solar masses and merged to form a black hole of 142 solar masses, with 8 solar masses radiated away as gravitational waves.

Another gravitational-wave signal (GW231123) from an intermediate mass black hole merger was observed on 23 November 2023 and announced by the LIGO-Virgo-KAGRA collaborations in July 2025.

Before that, the strongest evidence for IMBHs came from a few low-luminosity active galactic nuclei. Due to their activity, these galaxies almost certainly contain accreting black holes, and in some cases the black hole masses can be estimated using the technique of reverberation mapping. For instance, the spiral galaxy NGC 4395 at a distance of about 4 Mpc appears to contain a black hole with mass of about 3.6×10^{5} solar masses.

The largest up-to-date sample of intermediate-mass black holes includes 305 candidates selected by sophisticated analysis of one million optical spectra of galaxies collected by the Sloan Digital Sky Survey. X-ray emission was detected from 10 of these candidates confirming their classification as IMBH.

Some ultraluminous X-ray sources (ULXs) in nearby galaxies are suspected to be IMBHs, with masses of a hundred to a thousand solar masses. The ULXs are observed in star-forming regions (e.g., in starburst galaxy M82), and are seemingly associated with young star clusters which are also observed in these regions. However, only a dynamical mass measurement from the analysis of the optical spectrum of the companion star can unveil the presence of an IMBH as the compact accretor of the ULX.

A few globular clusters have been claimed to contain IMBHs, based on measurements of the velocities of stars near their centers; the figure shows one candidate object. However, none of the claimed detections has stood up to scrutiny. For instance, the data for M31 G1, the object shown in the figure, can be fit equally well without a massive central object.

Additional evidence for the existence of IMBHs can be obtained from observation of gravitational radiation, emitted from a binary containing an IMBH and a compact remnant or another IMBH.

Finally, the M–sigma relation predicts the existence of black holes with masses of 10^{4} to 10^{6} solar masses in low-luminosity galaxies. The smallest black hole from the M–sigma relation prediction is the nucleus of RGG 118 galaxy with only about 50,000 solar masses.

== Potential discoveries ==
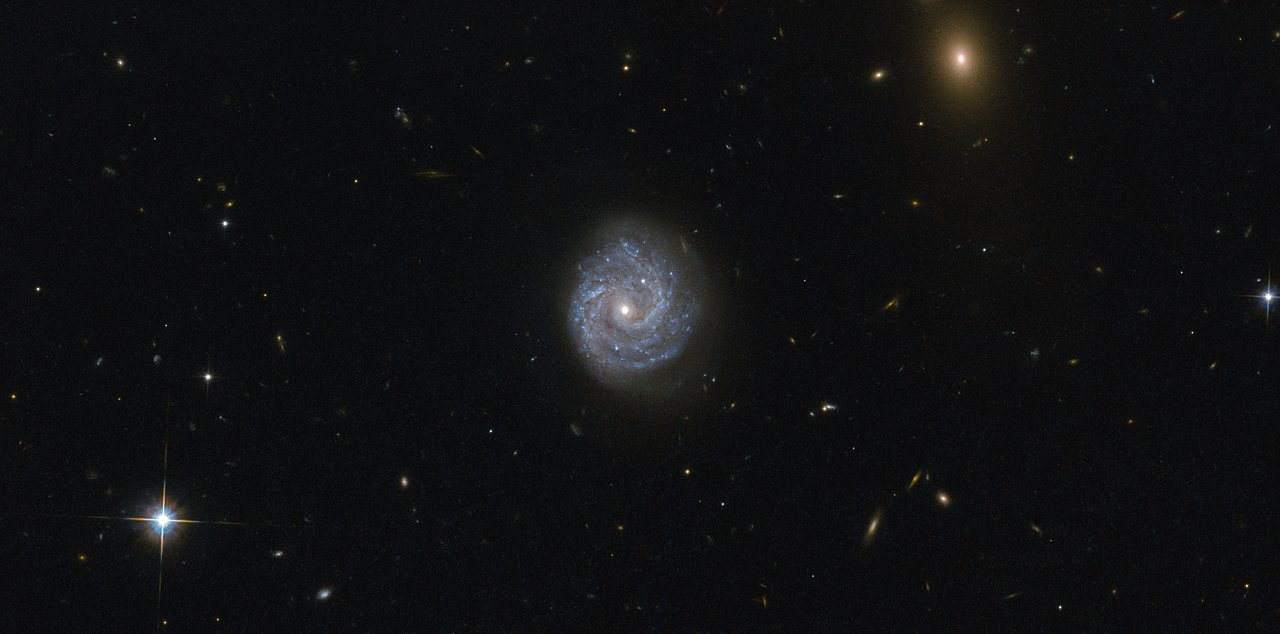
RX J1140.1+0307 is a spiral galaxy, centered on a lighter, intermediate-mass black hole.

In November 2004 a team of astronomers reported the discovery of GCIRS 13E, the first intermediate-mass black hole in the Milky Way galaxy, orbiting three light-years from Sagittarius A*. This medium black hole of 1,300 solar masses is within a cluster of seven stars, possibly the remnant of a massive star cluster that has been stripped down by the Galactic Center. This observation may add support to the idea that supermassive black holes grow by absorbing nearby smaller black holes and stars. However, in 2005, a German research group claimed that the presence of an IMBH near the galactic center is doubtful, based on a dynamical study of the star cluster in which the IMBH was said to reside. An IMBH near the galactic center could also be detected via its perturbations on stars orbiting around the supermassive black hole.

In January 2006 a team led by Philip Kaaret of the University of Iowa announced the discovery of a quasiperiodic oscillation from an intermediate-mass black hole candidate located using NASA's Rossi X-ray Timing Explorer. The candidate, M82 X-1, is orbited by a red giant star that is shedding its atmosphere into the black hole. Neither the existence of the oscillation nor its interpretation as the orbital period of the system are fully accepted by the rest of the scientific community, as the periodicity claimed is based on only about four cycles, meaning that it is possible for this to be random variation. If the period is real, it could be either the orbital period, as suggested, or a super-orbital period in the accretion disk, as is seen in many other systems.

In 2009, a team of astronomers led by Sean Farrell discovered HLX-1, an intermediate-mass black hole with a smaller cluster of stars around it, in the galaxy ESO 243–49. This evidence suggested that ESO 243-49 had a galactic collision with HLX-1's galaxy and absorbed the majority of the smaller galaxy's matter.

A team at the CSIRO radio telescope in Australia announced on 9 July 2012 that it had discovered the first intermediate-mass black hole.

In 2015 a team at Keio University in Japan found a gas cloud (CO-0.40-0.22) with very wide velocity dispersion. They performed simulations and concluded that a model with a black hole of around 100,000 solar masses would be the best fit for the velocity distribution. However, a later work pointed out some difficulties with the association of high-velocity dispersion clouds with intermediate mass black holes and proposed that such clouds might be generated by supernovae. Further theoretical studies of the gas cloud and nearby IMBH candidates have been inconclusive but have reopened the possibility.

In 2017, it was announced that a black hole of a few thousand solar masses may be located in the globular cluster 47 Tucanae. This was based on the accelerations and distributions of pulsars in the cluster; however, a later analysis of an updated and more complete data set on these pulsars found no positive evidence for this.

In 2018, the Keio University team found several molecular gas streams orbiting around an invisible object near the galactic center, designated HCN-0.009-0.044, suggested that it is a black hole of 32,000 solar masses and, if so, is the third IMBH discovered in the region.

Simulation of stellar motions in Messier 4, where astronomers suspect that an intermediate-mass black hole could be present. If confirmed, the black hole would be in the center of the cluster, and would have a sphere of influence (black hole) limited by the red circle.

Observations in 2019 found evidence for a gravitational wave event (GW190521) arising from the merger of two stellar-mass black holes, with masses of 66 and 85 times that of the Sun. In September 2020 it was announced that the resulting merged black hole weighed 142 solar masses, with 9 solar masses being radiated away as gravitational waves.

In 2020, astronomers reported the possible finding of an intermediate-mass black hole, named 3XMM J215022.4-055108, in the constellation Aquarius, about 740 million light years from Earth.

In 2021 the discovery of a 100,000 solar-mass intermediate-mass black hole in the globular cluster B023-G78 in the Andromeda Galaxy was posted to arXiv in a preprint.

In 2023, an analysis of proper motions of the closest known globular cluster, Messier 4, revealed an excess mass of roughly 800 solar masses in the center, which appears to not be extended, and could thus be considered as kinematic evidence for an IMBH (even if an unusually compact cluster of compact objects, white dwarfs, neutron stars or stellar-mass black holes cannot be completely discounted).

A study from July 10, 2024, examined seven fast-moving stars from the center of the globular cluster Omega Centauri, finding that these stars were consistent with being bound to an intermediate-mass black hole of at least 8,200 solar masses.

== Origin ==
Intermediate-mass black holes are too massive to be formed by the collapse of a single star, which is how stellar black holes are thought to form. Their environments lack the extreme conditions—i.e., high density and velocities observed at the centers of galaxies—which seemingly lead to the formation of supermassive black holes. There are three postulated formation scenarios for IMBHs. The first is the merging of stellar mass black holes and other compact objects by means of accretion. The second one is the runaway collision of massive stars in dense stellar clusters and the collapse of the collision product into an IMBH. The third is that they are primordial black holes formed in the Big Bang.

Scientists have also considered the possibility of the creation of intermediate-mass black holes through mechanisms involving the collapse of a single star, such as the possibility of direct collapse into black holes of stars with pre-supernova helium core mass >133 M_{☉} (to avoid a pair instability supernova which would completely disrupt the star), requiring an initial total stellar mass of > 260 M_{☉}, but there may be little chance of observing such a high-mass supernova remnant. Recent theories suggest that such massive stars which could lead to the formation of intermediate mass black holes may form in young star clusters via multiple stellar collisions.

== See also ==
- Pair-instability supernova
