= M33 X-7 =

Binary black hole-star systems in the constellation Triangulum

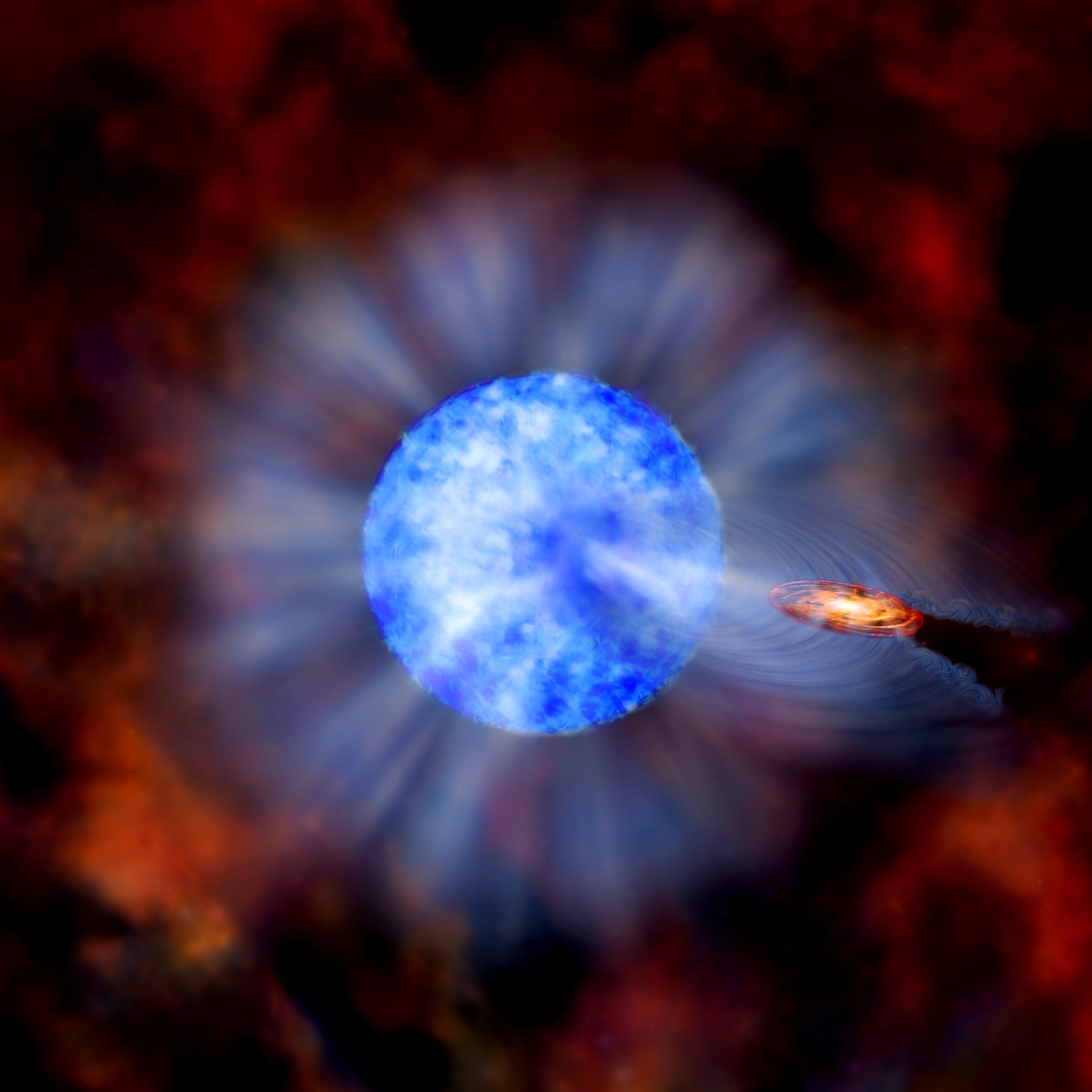
- Artist's representation of M33 X-7

Observation data Epoch J2000.0 Equinox ICRS
- Constellation: Triangulum
- Right ascension: 01^{h} 33^{m} 34.13^{s}
- Declination: +30° 32′ 11.3″
- Apparent magnitude (V): +18.70

Characteristics
- Spectral type: O7-8III / Black hole

Astrometry
Distance	2700000±70000 ly (840000±20000 pc)

Orbit
Period (P)	3.45301 ± 0.00002 d
Semi-major axis (a)	42.4 ± 1.5 R_{☉}
Eccentricity (e)	0.0185 ± 0.0077
Inclination (i)	74.6 ± 1.0°

Details

O-type star
Mass	70 ± 6.9 M_{☉}
Temperature	35,000 ± 1000 K

Black hole
Mass	15.65 ± 1.45 M_{☉}
Radius	0.000066 ± 0.0000061 R_{☉}

Other designations
- 1AXG J013335+3032, 2E 408, 2E 0130.7+3016, 2XMM J013334.0+303212, 3XMM J013334.0+303211, ChASeM33 137, ChASeM33 J013334.13+303211.3, CXOU J013334.1+303210, IFM-B 576, IFM-B 581, RX J0133.5+3032, XMMU J013334.0+303211, [HP2001] 71, [I92a] 47, [LCB96] 21, [LDC81] 7, [MBH96] 128, [MPH2006] 150, [PMH2004] 171, [SB95] 12, [SSA2010] 1272, [TFP88] X-7

Database references
SIMBAD	data

M33 X-7 is a black hole binary system in the Triangulum Galaxy. The system is made up of a stellar-mass black hole and a companion star. The black hole in M33 X-7 has an estimated mass of 15.65 times that of the Sun (M_{☉}) (formerly the largest known stellar black hole, though this has now been superseded amongst electromagnetically-observed black holes by an increased mass estimate for Cygnus X-1, and also by many of the LVK-detected binary black hole components). The total mass of the system is estimated to be around 85.7 M_{☉}, which would make it the most massive black hole binary system. The black hole is consuming its partner, a 70 solar mass blue giant star.

== Location ==
M33 X-7 lies within the Triangulum Galaxy which is approximately 3 million light-years (ly) distant from the Milky Way in constellation Triangulum. This would make M33 X-7 one of the furthest confirmed stellar mass black holes known.

== System ==
M33 X-7 orbits a companion star that eclipses the black hole every 3.45 days. The companion star also has an unusually large mass, 70 M_{☉}. This makes it the most massive companion star in a binary system containing a black hole.

== Observational data ==
The black hole was studied in combination by NASA's Chandra X-ray Observatory and the Gemini telescope on Mauna Kea, Hawaii.

The properties of the M33 X-7 binary system are difficult to explain using conventional models for the evolution of massive stars. The parent star for the black hole must have had a mass greater than the existing companion to have formed a black hole before the companion star. Such a massive star would have had a radius larger than the present separation between the stars, so the stars must have been brought closer while sharing a common outer atmosphere. This process typically results in a large amount of mass being lost from the system, so much that the parent star should not have been able to form a 15.7 M_{☉} black hole.

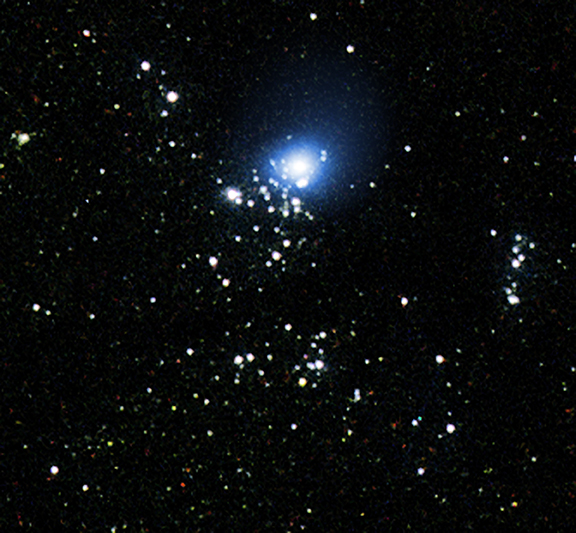
M33 X-7 composite

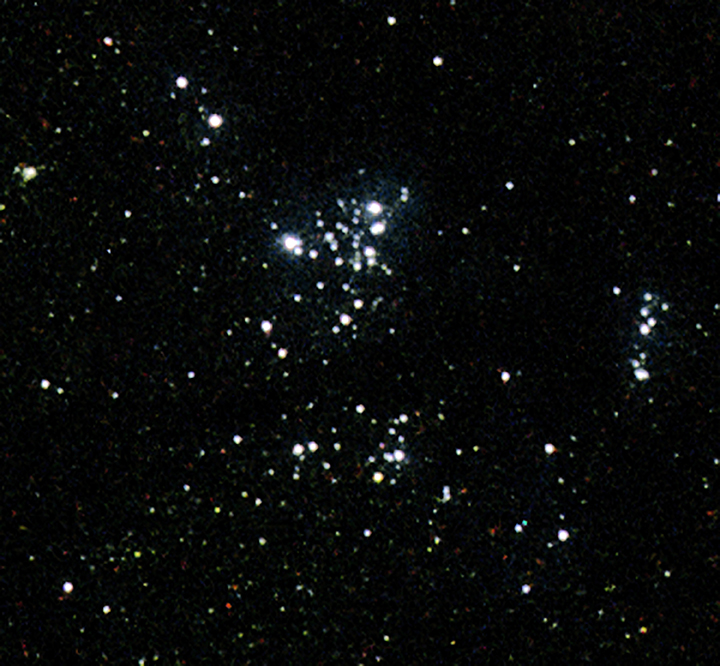
M33 X-7 optical

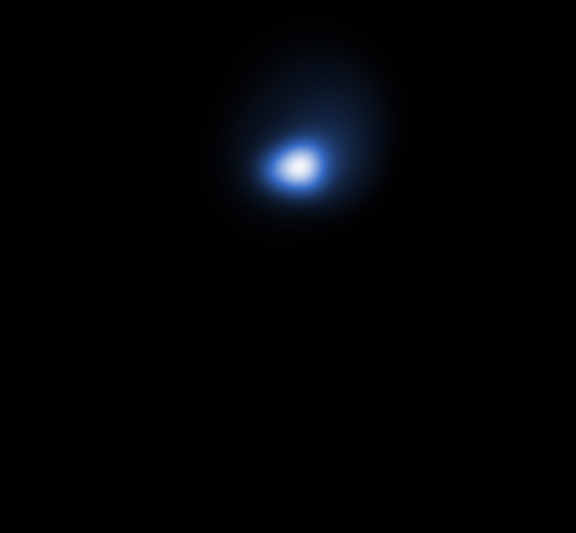
M33 X-7 X-ray

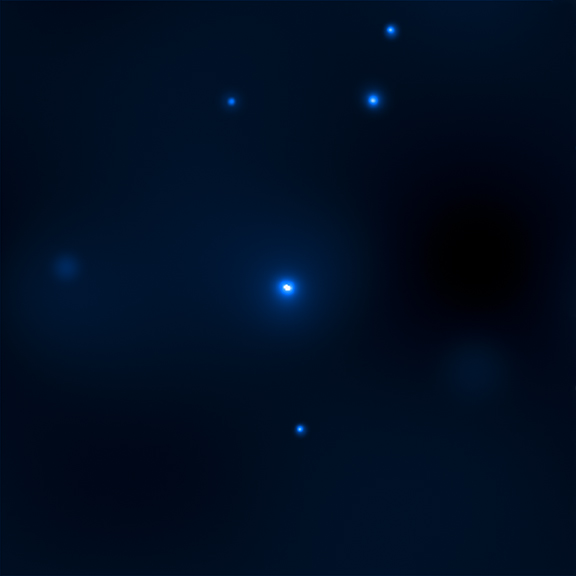
M33 X-7

In new models of the formation of the black hole, the star that will form the black hole is nearly 100 times the mass of the Sun, orbited by a second star with mass of about 30 M_{☉}.

In such an orbit, the future black hole is able to start transferring mass while it is still fusing hydrogen into helium. As a result, it loses most of its hydrogen becoming a Wolf–Rayet star and shedding the rest of the envelope in the form of stellar wind, exposing its core. Its companion grows more massive in the process, becoming more massive of the two stars.

Finally, the star collapses creating the black hole, and begins absorbing material from its companion, leading to X-ray emissions.

== Future ==
Due to the mass, it is assumed that the companion will collapse into a black hole, creating a binary black hole system.

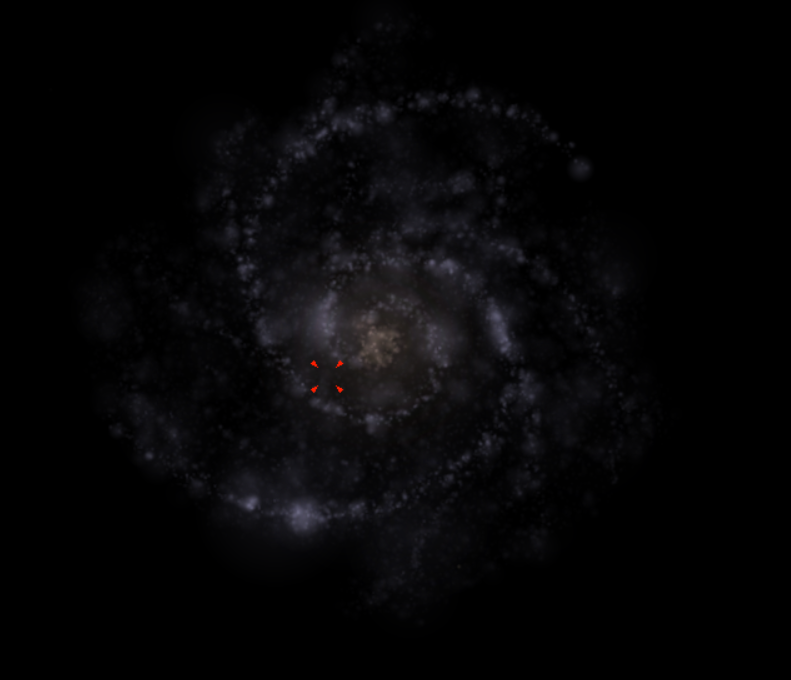
M33 X-7's Position in the Triangulum Galaxy

== See also ==
- List of most massive stars
