= NGC 300 X-1 =

X-ray binary in Galaxy NGC 300

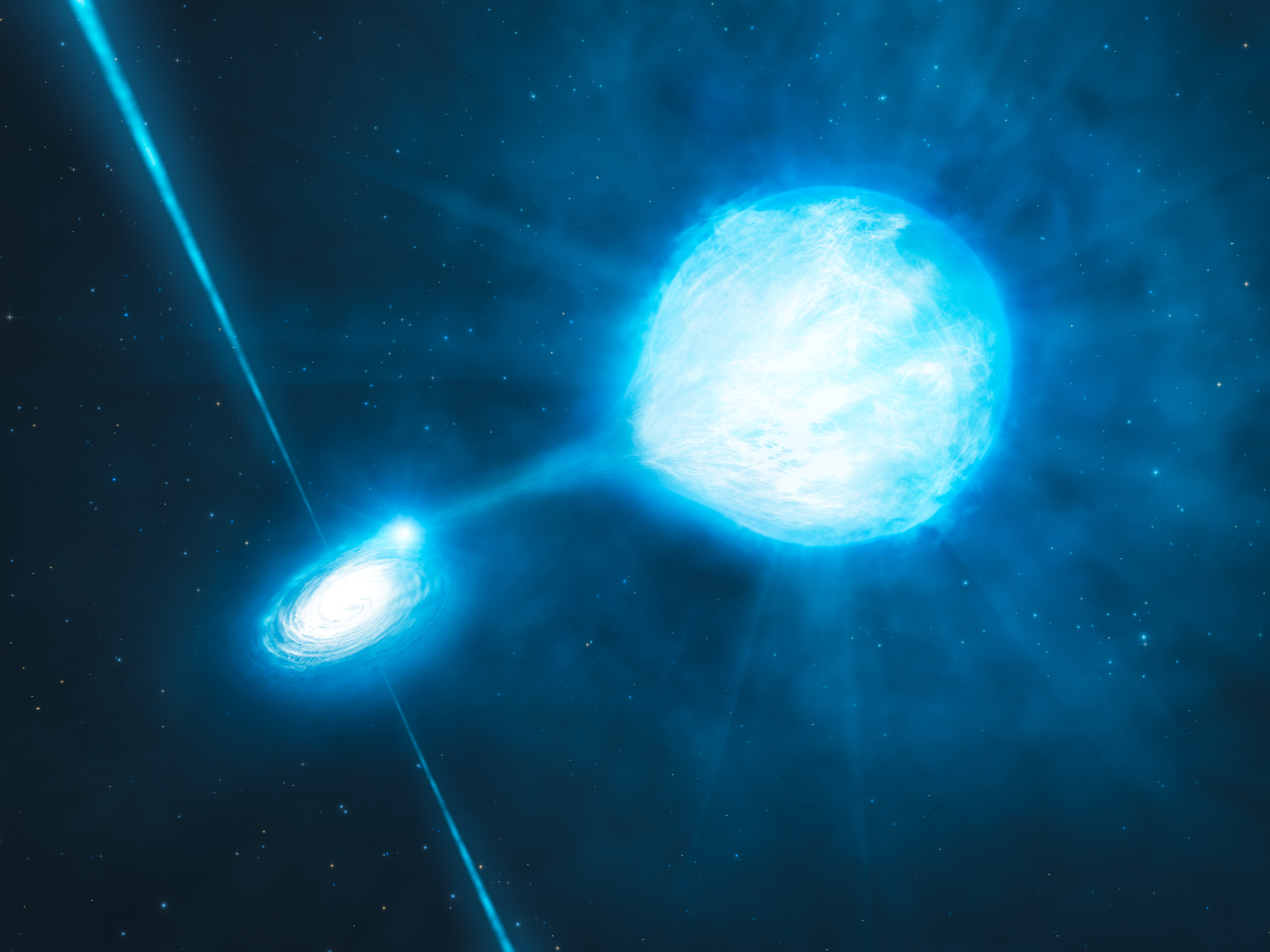
- Artistic representation of NGC 300 X-1

Observation data Epoch J2000.0 Equinox ICRS
- Constellation: Sculptor
- Right ascension: 00^{h} 55^{m} 09.99^{s}
- Declination: −37° 42′ 12.2″

Characteristics
- Evolutionary stage: Black hole + Wolf-Rayet
- Spectral type: WNE

Astrometry
Distance	6,070,000±0.23 ly

Details

Black hole
Mass	17±4 M_{☉}

WR
Mass	26+7 −5 M_{☉}

Other designations
- NGC 300 X-1, 2XMM J005510.0-374212, CXOU J005510.0-374212

Database references
SIMBAD	data

NGC 300 X-1 is a high mass X-ray binary system located in the spiral galaxy NGC 300, approximately 6 million light-years away in the constellation of Sculptor. It consists of a stellar-mass black hole orbiting a Wolf–Rayet star (specifically of WN spectral type), making it one of only a few confirmed extragalactic Wolf–Rayet-black hole binary systems, the other prominent example being IC 10 X-1.

== Observation ==
The system was first identified as an X-ray source, with periodic variability suggesting an orbital period. Subsequent spectroscopic observations using the Very Large Telescope (VLT) with the FORS2 instrument confirmed the association by detecting radial velocity variations in the He II λ4686 emission line of the Wolf–Rayet star (designated #41 in NGC 300), yielding an orbital period of 32.3±0.2 h, consistent with the X-ray period.

The black hole has a mass of 17±4 M_{☉} and the WR star has a mass of 26+7
−5 M_{☉}. Both objects orbit each other at a distance of about 18.2 R_{☉}.
