= 1X =

1X or 1-X may refer to:

- 1X Band, a musical group from Slovenia
- 1xBet, also known as "1X", an online gambling company
- 1. X. 1905, a piano composition by Leoš Janáček
- Saab 9-1X
- Alberta Highway 1X; see Alberta Highway 1A
- NY 1X; see Hutchinson River Parkway
- SSH 1X (WA); see List of former state highways in Washington
- CDMA2000 1x; see CDMA2000
- 1/x; see Multiplicative inverse
- 1x-EVDO; see Evolution-Data Optimized
- Ares 1-X; see Ares I-X
- Will 1x, early stage name for will.i.am
- 1x CD-ROM; see CD-ROM
- EH-1X; see Bell UH-1 Iroquois variants
- GSC-1X; see GSC bus
- Xbox One X
- HTC One X smartphone
- One-X, 2006 album by Three Days Grace
- Single scull in rowing
- 1X Technologies, an American robotics and artificial intelligence company

== See also ==
- X1 (disambiguation)
- Onex (disambiguation)
