= HCN−0.009−0.044 =

Interstellar gas cloud in the Milky Way

Nebula
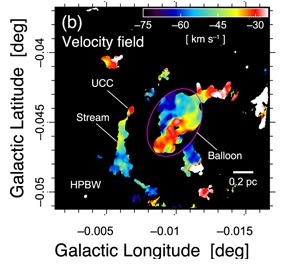
- Galactic longitude and latitude of HCN-0.009-0.044.

Observation data: J2000 epoch

Physical characteristics
- Radius: 1.5 ly

HCN−0.009−0.044 is an interstellar gas cloud near the centre of the Milky Way. The cloud is only 25 light-years from Sagittarius A*. It likely hosts an intermediate-mass black hole with a mass of 32,000 times that of the Sun. HCN−0.009−0.044 has a diameter of about 3 light years, and has relative gas movements of 40 km/s, with a kinematic energy of over 10^{47} ergs. The HCN in the name indicates the presence of hydrogen cyanide (HCN). HCN radiation at 354.6 GHz in the submillimeter was detected from the cloud.
