= Yamaha X-1 =

Type of motorcycle

The Yamaha X-1 is a commuter-style motorbike that is manufactured in Thailand. The motorbike is designed to compete with the 110 cc Honda Wave and the Suzuki Smash, a city commuter-style motorbike.

== Motor ==
The Yamaha X-1 is powered by a 2-valve, 4-stroke, 110 cc motorcycle. It is a low-RPM motor that uses air cooling. Designed to beat Honda Wave 125 in performance and fuel efficiency.

=== Statistics ===
Stat Name	Statistic
Size (cc)	110.3 cc (110)
Bore x Stroke	51.0 x 54.0 mm
Max power	8.8 hp / 8,000 rpm
Max Torque	0,92 kgf.m / 5,000 rpm
Max Speed	120 km/h
0–100 km/h	Unknown
Max RPM	Unknown
Engine Type	4 stroke SOHC 2valve
Carburetor	Mikuni VM-17
Brake Type	Disk (front), Drum (rear)
Fuel Tank Capacity	4.5 liters
Fuel Consumption	86.0 km/liter at 30km/hr running speed

== See also ==
- Honda Sonic 125
- Yamaha X-1R
