= LEDA 1245565 =

Spiral galaxy located in the constellation Virgo

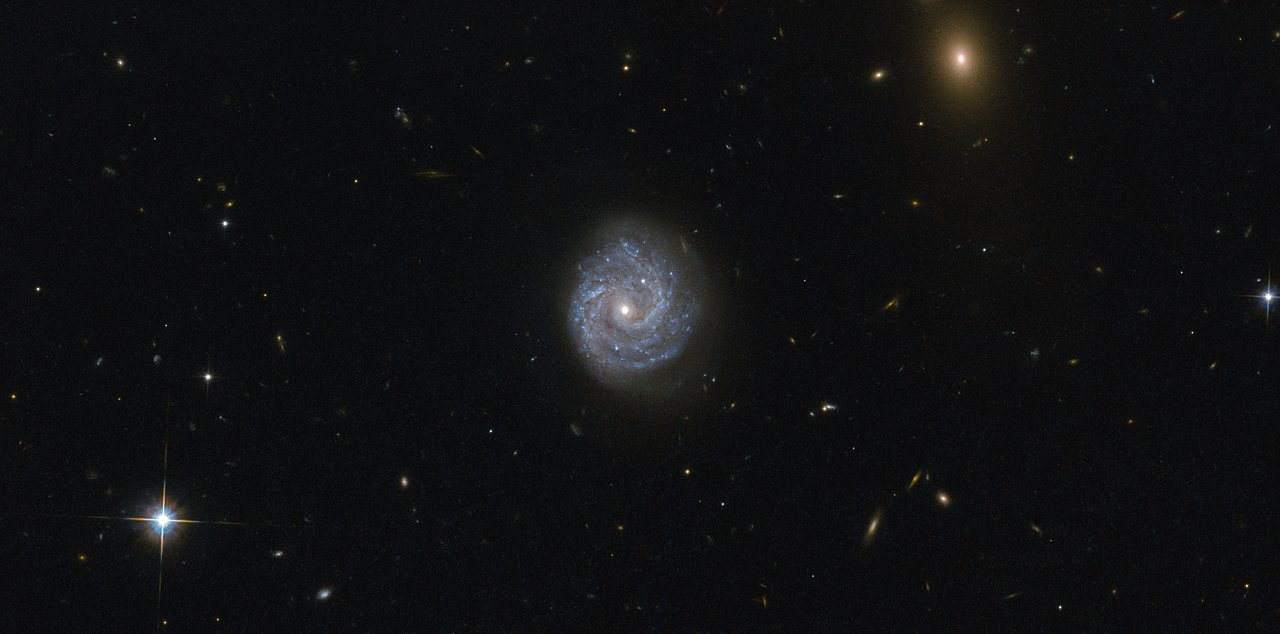
- LEDA 1245565 imaged by the Hubble Space Telescope

Observation data (J2000.0 epoch)
- Constellation: Virgo
- Right ascension: 11^{h} 40^{m} 08.71^{s}
- Declination: +03° 07′ 11.39″
- Redshift: 0.081023
- Heliocentric radial velocity: 24,309 km/s
- Distance: 1.04 Gly
- Apparent magnitude (V): 17.3

Characteristics
- Type: SBa

Other designations
- LEDA 1245565, 2MASX J11400874+0307114, RX J1140.1+0307

LEDA 1245565 (known as RX J1140.1+0307) is a spiral galaxy located 1.04 billion light-years away in the constellation of Virgo. It has a similar structure to the Milky Way, though it has a low black hole mass. It has an active galactic nucleus and is classified as a narrow-line Seyfert 1 galaxy with enhanced star formations.
