= GW190521 =

Gravitational-wave observation

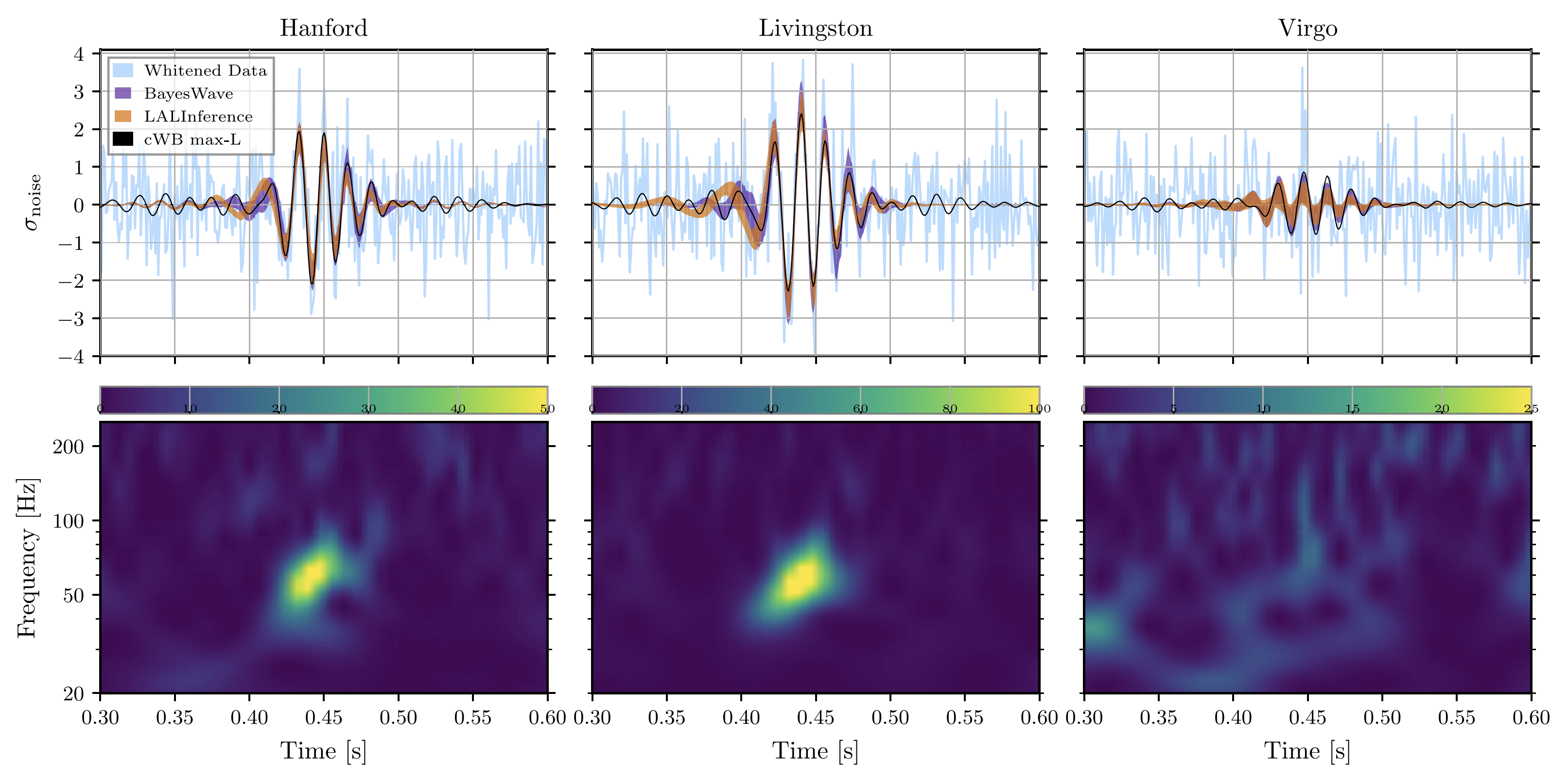
- The GW event GW190521 observed by the LIGO Hanford (left), LIGO Livingston (middle), and Virgo (right) detectors
- Date: 21 May 2019
- Instrument: LIGO, Virgo
- Constellation: Centaurus
- Right ascension: 12^{h} 49^{m} 42.3^{s}
- Declination: −34° 49′ 29″
- Epoch: J2000.0
- Distance: 5,300 megaparsecs (17,000 Mly)
- Related media on Commons

GW190521 (initially S190521g) was a gravitational wave signal resulting from the merger of two black holes. It was possibly associated with a coincident flash of light; if this association is correct, the merger would have occurred near a third supermassive black hole. The event was observed by the LIGO and Virgo detectors on 21 May 2019 at 03:02:29 UTC, and published on 2 September 2020. The event had a Luminosity distance of 17 billion light years away from Earth, (Note: "The event unfolded at an almost unimaginable distance from Earth — in a spot that is now 17 billion light-years away according to standard cosmological calculations that describe an expanding universe.") within a 765 deg^{2} area (Note: The relatively large and distant area of the sky within which it is claimed to be possible to localize the source.) towards one of two roughly antipodal areas of the sky, one centered around Coma Berenices and the other in Tucana.

At 85 and 66 solar masses (M_{☉}) respectively, the two black holes comprising this merger are the largest progenitor masses observed to date. The resulting black hole had a mass equivalent to 142 times that of the Sun, making this the first clear detection of an intermediate-mass black hole. The remaining 8 solar masses were radiated away as energy in the form of gravitational waves.

== Physical significance ==
GW190521 is a significant discovery due to the masses of the resulting large black hole and of one or both of the smaller constituent black holes. Stellar evolution theory predicts that a star cannot collapse itself into a black hole of more than about 65 M_{☉}, leaving a black hole mass gap above 65 M_{☉}. The 85+21
−14 M_{☉} (Note: This notation is used to state asymmetric uncertainty.) and 142+28
−16 M_{☉} black holes observed in GW190521 are conclusively in the mass gap, indicating that it can be populated by the mergers of smaller black holes.

Only indirect evidence for intermediate mass black holes, those with between 100 and 100,000 solar masses, had been observed earlier, and it was unclear how they had formed. Researchers hypothesize that they form from a hierarchical series of mergers, in which each black hole is the result of successive mergers involving smaller black holes.

According to discovery team member Vassiliki Kalogera of Northwestern University, "this is the first and only firm/secure mass measurement of an intermediate mass black hole at the time of its birth ... Now we know reliably at least one way [such objects can form], through the merger of other black holes."

== Possible electromagnetic counterpart ==
In June 2020, astronomers reported observations of a flash of light in Centaurus that might be associated with GW190521. The Zwicky Transient Facility (ZTF) reported a transient optical source within the region of the GW190521 trigger, though as the uncertainty in sky position was hundreds of square degrees, the association remains uncertain. If the two events are actually linked, the event is claimed to be the first finding of an electromagnetic source related to the merger of two black holes. Mergers of black holes do not typically emit any light. The researchers suggest that it could be explained if the merging of the two smaller black holes sent the newly formed intermediate mass black hole on a trajectory that hurtled through the accretion disk of an unrelated but nearby supermassive black hole, disrupting the disk material and producing a flare of light. The newly formed black hole would have traveled at 200 km/s (120 mi/s) through the disk, according to the astronomers. If this explanation is correct, the flare should repeat after about 1.6 years when the intermediate mass black hole again encounters the accretion disk. As of 2023, the status of the connection between these two events is unconfirmed.

According to Matthew Graham, lead astronomer for the study, "This supermassive black hole was burbling along for years before this more abrupt flare. The flare occurred on the right timescale, and in the right location, to be coincident with the gravitational-wave event. In our study, we conclude that the flare is likely the result of a black hole merger, but we cannot completely rule out other possibilities."

== Possible eccentricity ==
While the original LIGO/Virgo data analysis assumed a quasi-circular inspiral waveform model, subsequent publications claimed that this source could have been significantly eccentric. Romero-Shaw et al. showed that the data is better described by a non-precessing eccentric waveform with $e_{\rm 10 Hz}\geq 0.1$ than a spin-precessing quasi-circular model. Using eccentric waveforms based on numerical relativity, Gayathri et al. 2020 found a best fit with $e_{\rm 10 Hz}=0.67$ and source masses 102+7
−11 M_{☉} for both merging black holes.

== See also ==
- Gravitational-wave astronomy
- List of gravitational wave observations
- Multi-messenger astronomy
