= LMC X-1 =

Star in the constellation Dorado

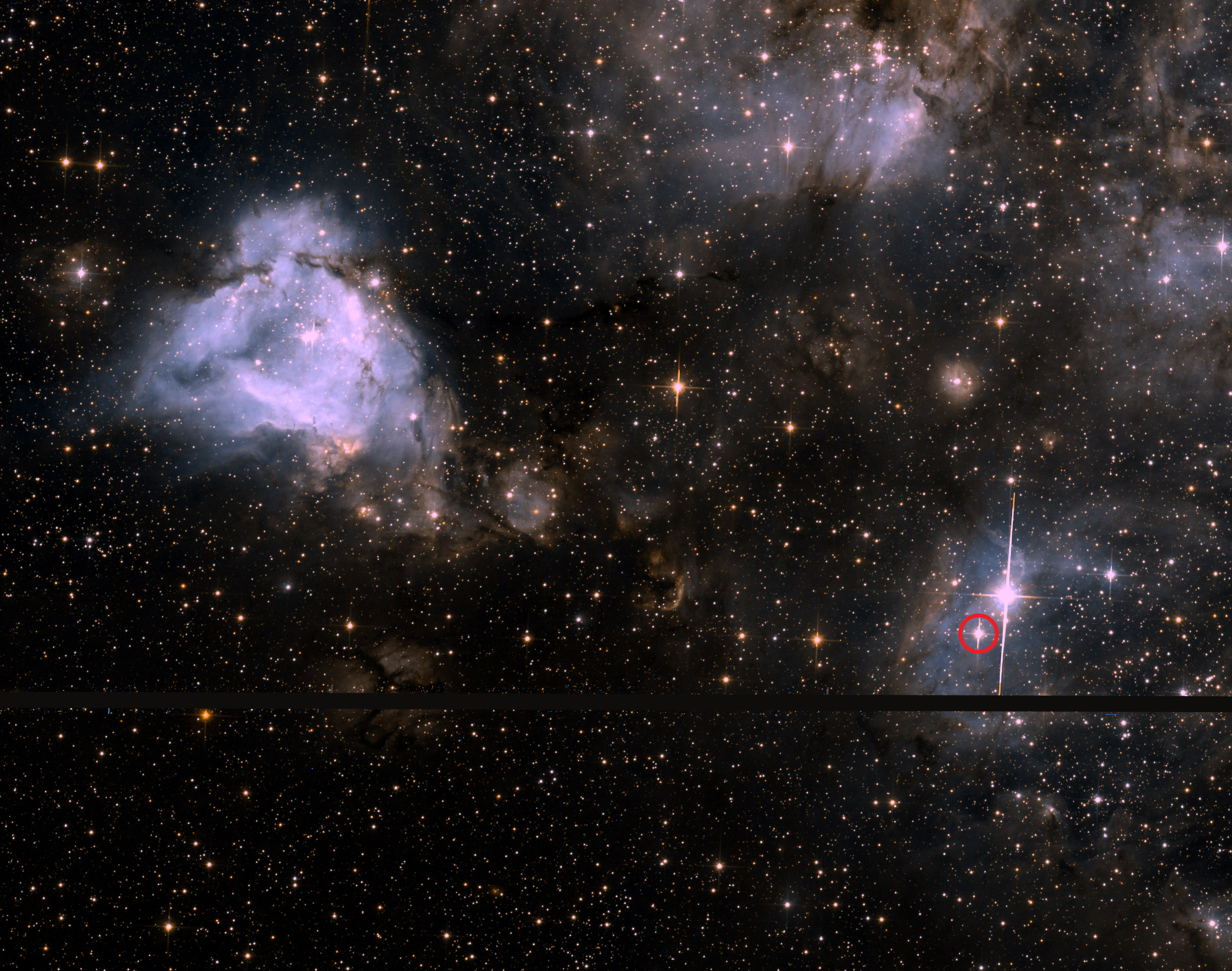
- Hubble image of LMC X-1 (right side: star in the red circle) and NGC 2079 (nebula on the left)

Observation data Epoch J2000 Equinox J2000
- Constellation: Dorado
- Right ascension: 05^{h} 39^{m} 38.8284^{s}
- Declination: −69° 44′ 35.5315″
- Apparent magnitude (V): 14.612 ± 0.171

Characteristics
- Evolutionary stage: X-ray binary
- Spectral type: O8 IIIf or O8 f?p

Astrometry
Radial velocity (R_{v})	309.12 ± 0.333 km/s
Proper motion (μ)	RA: 1.889 ± 0.020 mas/yr Dec.: 0.622 ± 0.023 mas/yr
Distance	180,000 ly (55,000 pc)

Orbit
Primary	giant star
Secondary	black hole
Period (P)	3.90917 ± 0.00005 days
Semi-major axis (a)	36.49 ± 1.51 R_{☉}
Eccentricity (e)	<0.0256 ± 0.0066
Inclination (i)	36.38 ± 2.02°
Semi-amplitude (K_{2}) (secondary)	71.61 ± 1.10 km/s

Details

star
Mass	31.79 ± 3.48 M_{☉}
Radius	17.0 ± 0.8 R_{☉}
Surface gravity (log g)	3.485 ± 0.018 cgs
Temperature	33,000 to 35,000 K
Rotational velocity (v sin i)	129.9 ± 2.2 km/s
Age	5 Myr

black hole
Mass	10.91 ± 1.41 M_{☉}

Other designations
- 2MASS J05393883-6944356, 2E 1522, 1RXS J053938.8-694515

Database references
SIMBAD	data

LMC X-1 is the first X-ray source detected in the Large Magellanic Cloud. It was discovered in 1969, using data from an instrument carried by a Sandia Terrier-Sandhawk sounding rocket, launched from the Johnston Atoll on October 29, 1968. LMC X-1 is a persistently luminous X-ray binary.

In the 80s Hutchings et al. performed spectroscopic follow-up observations of the optical counterpart and found an orbital period of about 4 days and a secondary mass of about 6 M_{☉}, making the secondary a stellar mass black hole. The orbital period later turned out to be shorter at around 3.9 days. The optical counterpart is also called "star 32". The black hole has a mass of around 11 M_{☉} and the star has a mass of around 32 M_{☉} and a radius of 17 R_{☉}. With this radius the star nearly fills its Roche lobe and it is predicted that it will encounter its Roche lobe in a few hundred thousand years. Once it reaches its Roche lobe, it will begin rapid and possibly unstable mass transfer to its companion.

The X-ray source is surrounded by a nebula, which is the only nebula energized by an X-ray binary. It is suspected that the nebula is a bow shock nebula. The nebula is also detected in radio wavelengths with ATCA imaging. A possible origin of LMC X-1 is the star cluster [NKN2005] N159-O1. Other possible origins are NGC 2077, NGC 2080, NGC 2085 and NGC 2086. In the scenario of N159-O1 being the origin, the progenitor to the black hole would have a mass of about 60 M_{☉}, meaning it was the most massive member of this star cluster.

== See also ==
- M33 X-7 is a stellar mass black hole in the Triangulum Galaxy
- Cyg X-1 another x-ray binary with a stellar black hole and a massive star
- Gaia BH1 first dormant black hole
