= MAXI J1820+070 =

X-ray binary in the constellation Pegasus

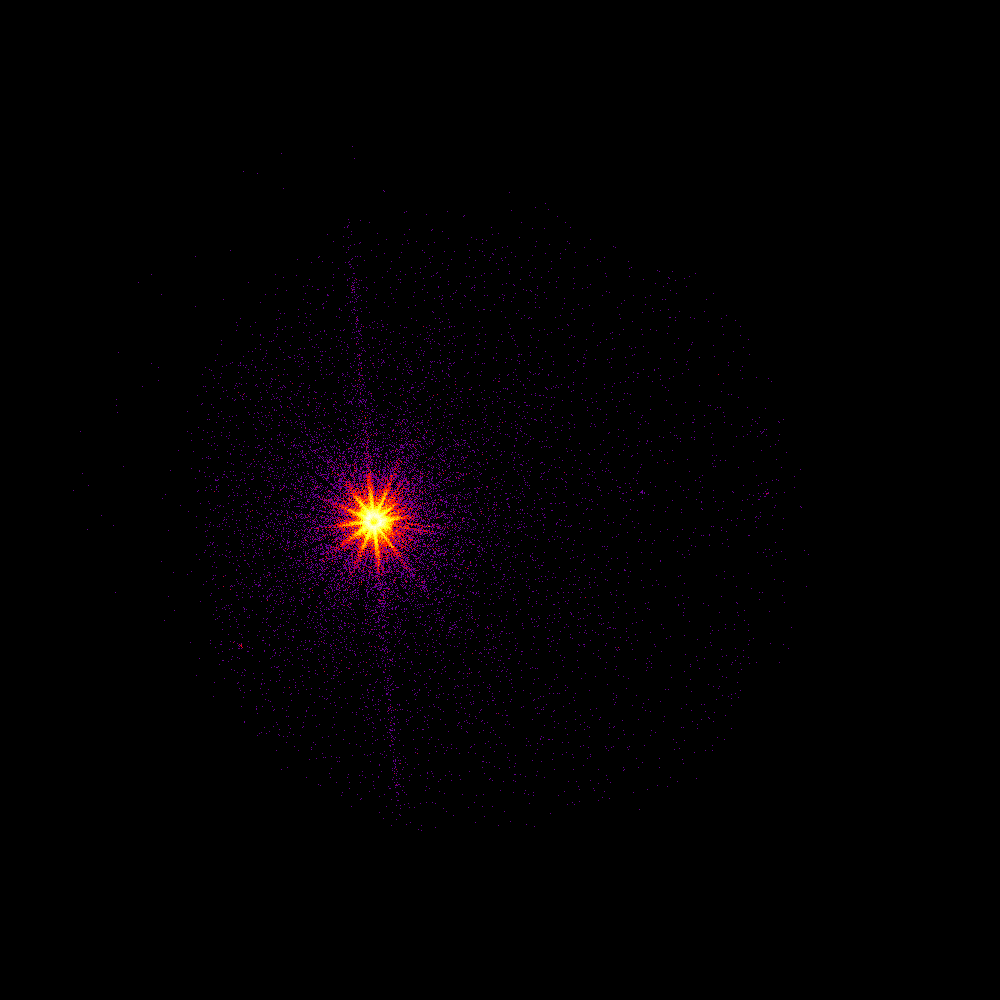
- MAXI J1830+070 imaged by Neil Gehrels Swift Observatory

Observation data Epoch J2000.0 Equinox ICRS
- Constellation: Ophiuchus
- Right ascension: 18^{h} 20^{m} 21.942^{s}
- Declination: +07° 11′ 07.28″
- Apparent magnitude (V): 12±19

Characteristics
- Spectral type: K3-K5

Astrometry
Proper motion (μ)	RA: −3.093 mas/yr Dec.: −6.286 mas/yr
Parallax (π)	0.3692±0.078 mas
Distance	9,700 ± 1,100 ly (2,960±330 pc)

Orbit
Period (P)	0.68549 d
Eccentricity (e)	0.026
Inclination (i)	66–81°

Details

Primary
Mass	5 to 10 M_{☉}

Secondary
Mass	0.49±0.10 M_{☉}

Other designations
- ASASSN-18ey, MAXI J1820+070, TIC 317984780, 2MASS J18202194+0711073, WISE J182021.94+071107.2

Database references
SIMBAD	data

MAXI J1820+070 is an X-ray binary system in the equatorial constellation of Ophiuchus. It was discovered in 2018, when it underwent a flare event, becoming one of the brightest such objects ever observed (in both the visual and X-ray bands). Based on parallax measurements, it is located at a distance of approximately 9.7 ± 1.1 kly (2.96 ± 0.33 kpc) from the Sun.

== Discovery ==
This target was discovered March 6, 2018 by the All Sky Automated Survey for SuperNovae at an apparent visual magnitude of 14.88. Previously it had been at magnitudes below 16.7. On March 11, X-ray emission from this source was detected by the MAXI telescope, mounted on the International Space Station. On March 13, the Swift Burst Alert Telescope was triggered by MAXI J1820+070.

Subsequently, the source underwent three re-brightenings that were extensively monitored, before its final optical activity was observed in April 2021. It began fading rapidly in June 2023 and returned to quiescence at its pre-brightening level after five years.

== Observations ==
Optical observations of this transient source, combined with distance estimates, indicated it is consistent with a low-mass X-ray binary system containing a candidate black hole. The spectra displayed hydrogen absorption lines with emission cores, suggesting an accretion disk undergoing outburst. By April 4, 2018, quasi-periodic oscillations had been observed in both the X-ray and visual bands with variability on time scales of less than a second. Optical variation of 0.03–0.10 in magnitude showed a periodicity of 3.4 hours, suggesting this may be the orbital period.

In 2019, the presence of a black hole in the system was confirmed through measurements of the system dynamics. The cool, evolved, low mass companion is transferring matter via its Roche lobe to an accretion disk orbiting the black hole. This disk is truncated at around 51 times the gravitational radii, and has a high density of around 10^{20} cm^{−3}. Observations suggest the disk may be warped and is precessing. The black hole has an estimated spin parameter of a ~ 0.77 ± 0.21.

An accurate radio parallax measurement was made in 2020, providing a distance estimate of 9,700 ± 1,100 ly. The detection of knots in the ejecta allowed the angle of the jet to be measured as 64°±5° to the plane of the sky relative to Earth. The ejecta is moving at ~0.97 c, where c is the speed of light.

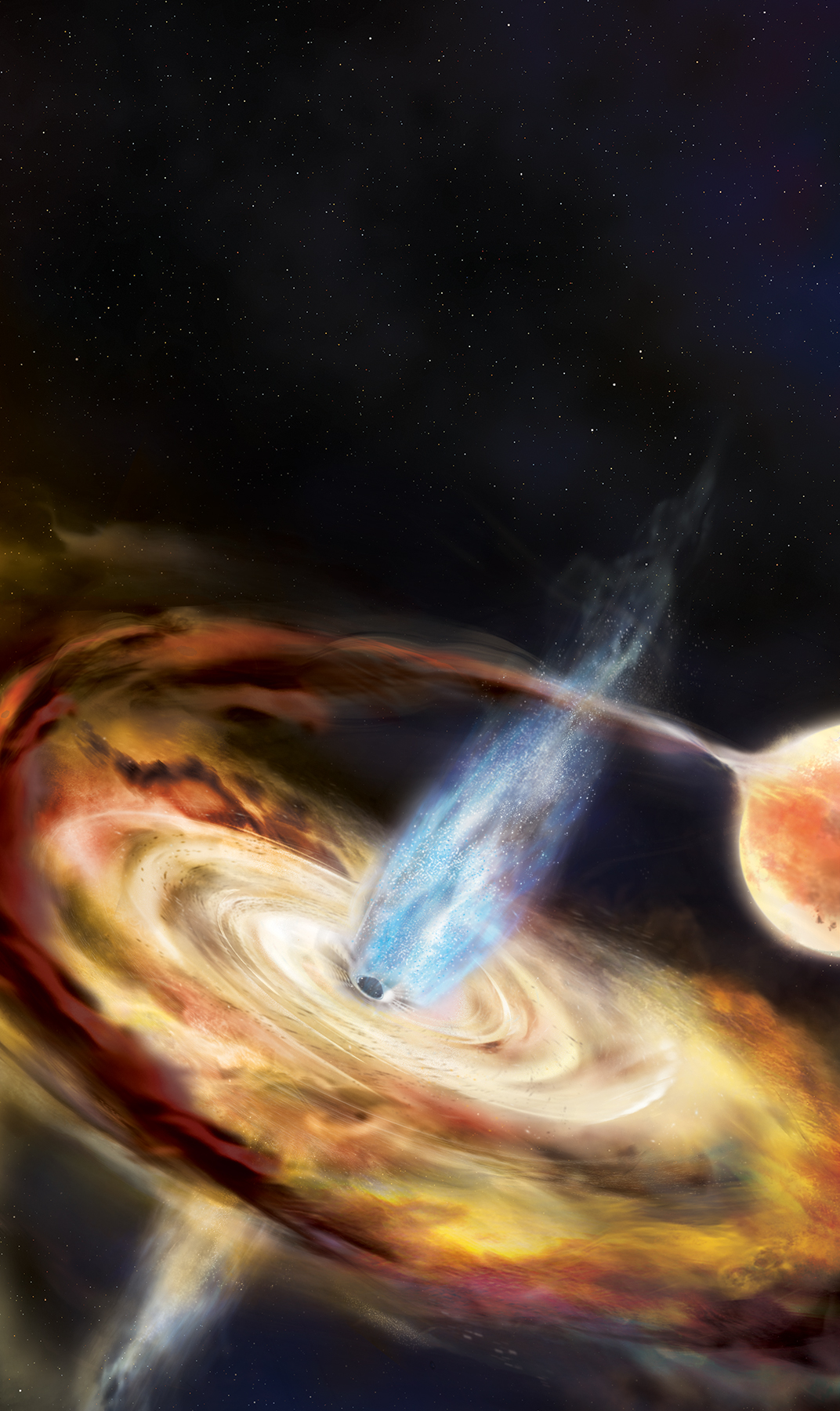
Artistic representation of MAXI J1830+070 system
