= NuSTAR =

NASA X-ray space telescope of the Explorer program

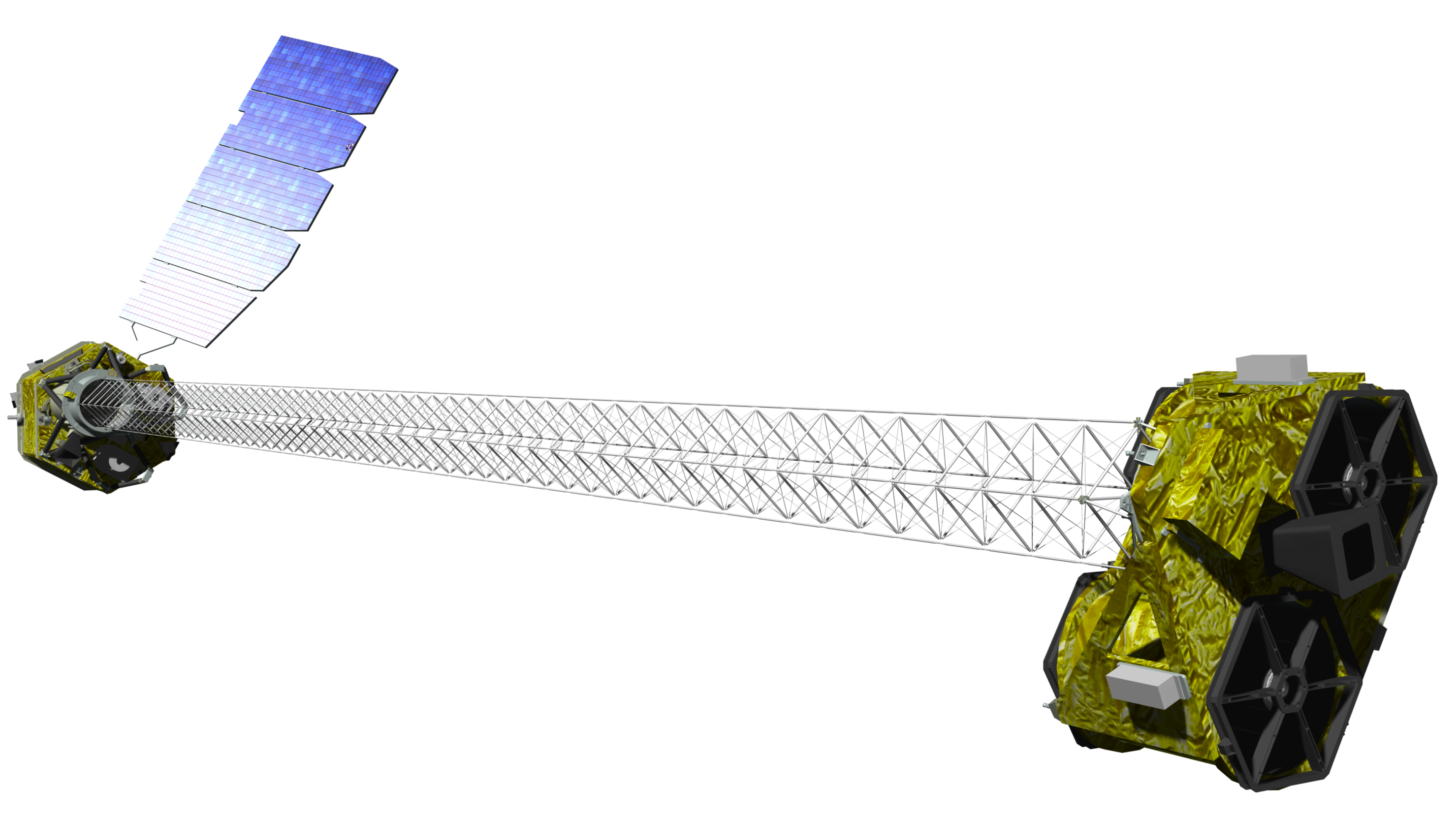
- NuSTAR (Explorer 93) satellite
- Names: Explorer 93; Nuclear Spectroscopic Telescope Array; SMEX-11
- Mission type: X-ray astronomy
- Operator: NASA / JPL
- COSPAR ID: 2012-031A
- SATCAT no.: 38358
- Website: www.nustar.caltech.edu
- Mission duration: 2 years (planned); 14 years, 4 months, 24 days (in progress)

Spacecraft properties
- Spacecraft: Explorer XCIII
- Spacecraft type: Nuclear Spectroscopic Telescope Array
- Bus: LEOStar-2
- Manufacturer: Orbital ATK (formerly Orbital Sciences Corporation and ATK Space Components)
- Launch mass: 350 kg (770 lb)
- Payload mass: 171 kg (377 lb)
- Dimensions: 1.2 × 10.9 m (3 ft 11 in × 35 ft 9 in)
- Power: 750 watts

Start of mission
- Launch date: 13 June 2012, 16:00:37 UTC
- Rocket: Pegasus XL (F41)
- Launch site: Kwajalein Atoll, Stargazer
- Contractor: Orbital Sciences Corporation

Orbital parameters
- Reference system: Geocentric orbit
- Regime: Near-equatorial orbit
- Perigee altitude: 596.6 km (370.7 mi)
- Apogee altitude: 612.6 km (380.7 mi)
- Inclination: 6.027°
- Period: 96.8 minutes

Main telescope
- Type: Wolter type I
- Focal length: 10.15 m (33.3 ft)
- Collecting area: 9 keV: 847 cm^{2} (131.3 sq in); 78 keV: 60 cm^{2} (9.3 sq in)
- Wavelengths: 3–79 keV
- Resolution: 9.5 arcseconds

Instruments
- Dual X-ray telescope

NuSTAR (Nuclear Spectroscopic Telescope Array, also named Explorer 93 and SMEX-11) is a NASA space-based X-ray telescope that uses a conical approximation to a Wolter telescope to focus high energy X-rays from astrophysical sources, especially for nuclear spectroscopy, and operates in the range of 3 to 79 keV.

NuSTAR is the eleventh mission of NASA's Small Explorer (SMEX-11) satellite program and the first space-based direct-imaging X-ray telescope at energies beyond those of the Chandra X-ray Observatory and XMM-Newton. It was successfully launched on 13 June 2012, having previously been delayed from 21 March 2012 due to software issues with the launch vehicle.

The mission's primary scientific goals are to conduct a deep survey for black holes a billion times more massive than the Sun, to investigate how particles are accelerated to very high energy in active galaxies, and to understand how the elements are created in the explosions of massive stars by imaging supernova remnants.

Having completed a two-year primary mission, NuSTAR is in its fourteenth year of operation.

== History ==
NuSTAR's predecessor, the High Energy Focusing Telescope (HEFT), was a balloon-borne version that carried telescopes and detectors constructed using similar technologies. In February 2003, NASA issued an Explorer program Announcement of Opportunity (AoO). In response, NuSTAR was submitted to NASA in May 2003, as one of 36 mission proposals vying to be the tenth and eleventh Small Explorer missions. In November 2003, NASA selected NuSTAR and four other proposals for a five-month implementation feasibility study.

In January 2005, NASA selected NuSTAR for flight pending a one-year feasibility study. The program was cancelled in February 2006 as a result of cuts to science in NASA's 2007 budget. On 21 September 2007, it was announced that the program had been restarted, with an expected launch in August 2011, though this was later delayed to June 2012.

The principal investigator is Fiona A. Harrison of the California Institute of Technology (Caltech). Other major partners include the Jet Propulsion Laboratory (JPL), University of California, Berkeley, Technical University of Denmark (DTU), Columbia University, Goddard Space Flight Center (GSFC), Stanford University, University of California, Santa Cruz, Sonoma State University, Lawrence Livermore National Laboratory, and the Italian Space Agency (ASI). NuSTAR's major industrial partners include Orbital Sciences Corporation and ATK Space Components.

== Launch ==
NASA contracted with Orbital Sciences Corporation to launch NuSTAR (mass 350 kg (770 lb)) on a Pegasus XL launch vehicle on 21 March 2012. It had earlier been planned for 15 August 2011, 3 February 2012, 16 March 2012, and 14 March 2012. After a launch meeting on 15 March 2012, the launch was pushed further back to allow time to review flight software used by the launch vehicle's flight computer. The launch was conducted successfully at 16:00:37 UTC on 13 June 2012 about 117 mi (188 km) south of Kwajalein Atoll. The Pegasus launch vehicle was dropped from the L-1011 'Stargazer' aircraft.

On 22 June 2012, it was confirmed that the 10 m (33 ft) mast was fully deployed.

== Optics ==
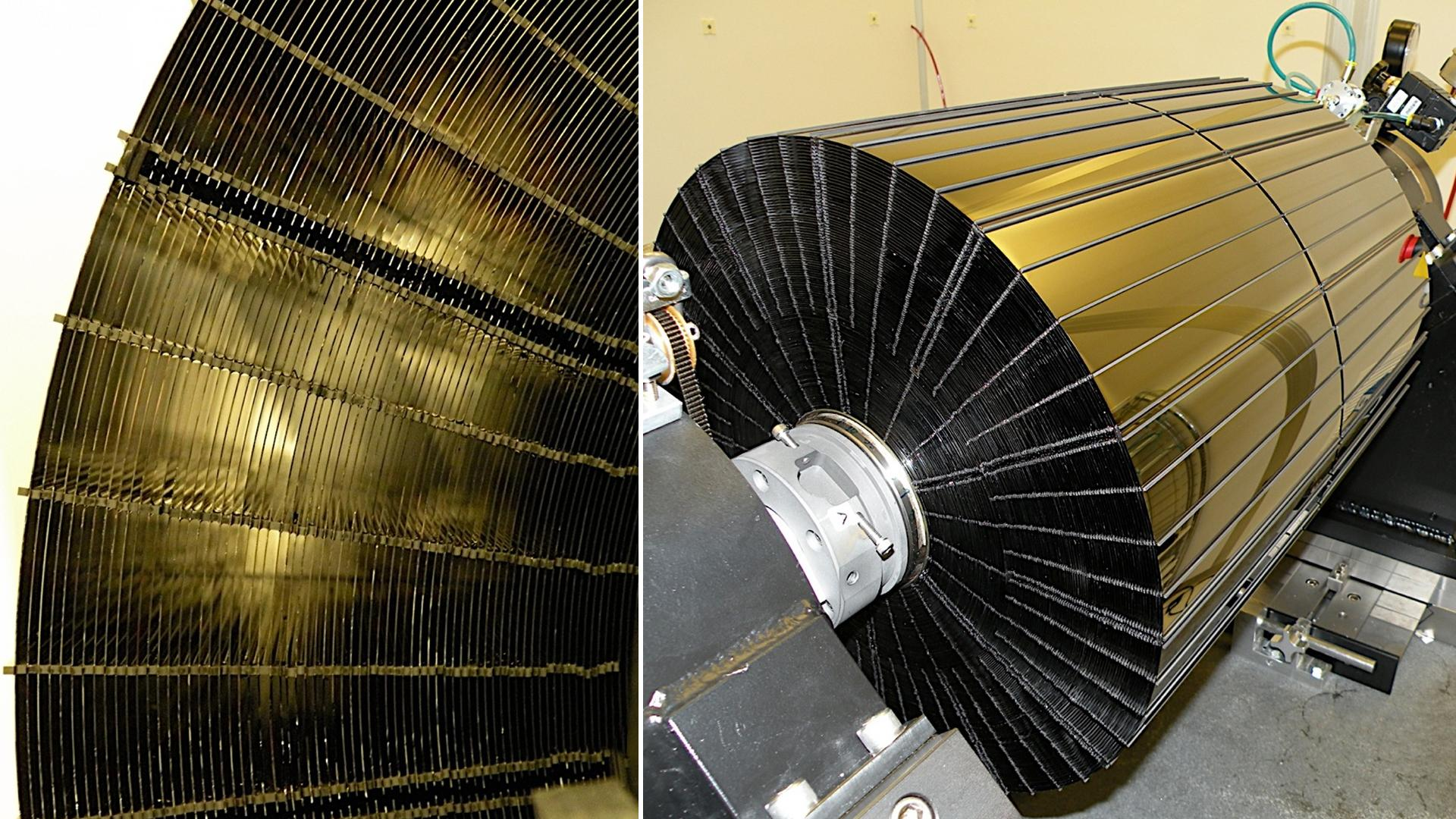
NuSTAR's nested X-ray mirrors

Focusing X-rays with a Wolter Type-1 optical system

Unlike visible light telescopes – which employ mirrors or lenses working with normal incidence – NuSTAR has to employ grazing incidence optics to be able to focus X-rays. For this two conical approximation Wolter telescope design optics with 10.15 m (33.3 ft) focal length are held at the end of a long deployable mast. A laser metrology system is used to determine the exact relative positions of the optics and the focal plane at all times, so that each detected photon can be mapped back to the correct point on the sky even if the optics and the focal plane move relative to one another during an exposure.

Each focusing optic consists of 133 concentric shells. One particular innovation enabling NuSTAR is that these shells are coated with depth-graded multilayers (alternating atomically thin layers of a high-density and low-density material); with NuSTAR's choice of Pt/SiC and W/Si multilayers, this enables reflectivity up to 79 keV (the platinum K-edge energy).

The optics were produced, at Goddard Space Flight Center, by heating thin (210 μm (0.0083 in)) sheets of flexible glass in an oven so that they slumped over precision-polished cylindrical quartz mandrels of the appropriate radius. The coatings were applied by a group at the Danish Technical University.

The shells were then assembled, at the Nevis Laboratories of Columbia University, using graphite spacers machined to constrain the glass to the conical shape, and held together by epoxy. There are 4680 mirror segments in total (the 65 inner shells each comprise six segments and the 65 outer shells twelve; there are upper and lower segments to each shell, and there are two telescopes); there are five spacers per segment. Since the epoxy takes 24 hours to cure, one shell is assembled per day – it took four months to build up one optic.

The actual telescope consists of two separate Focal Plane Modules (FPMs) labelled FPMA and FPMB. These two FPMs are built to be similar, though they are not identical. Depending on the source and on the observation, one of the modules will usually report higher counts. This is corrected for in the science results step, usually by apply a constant multiplier during spectral fitting and light curve analysis.

The expected point spread function for the flight mirrors is 43 arcseconds, giving a spot size of about two millimeters at the focal plane; this is unprecedentedly good resolution for focusing hard X-ray optics, though it is about one hundred times worse than the best resolution achieved at longer wavelengths by the Chandra X-ray Observatory.

== Detectors ==
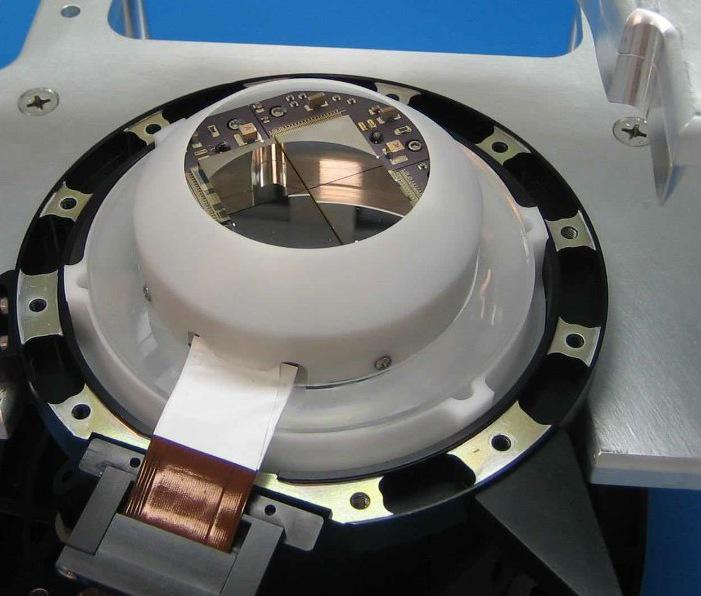
One of NuSTAR's two detectors

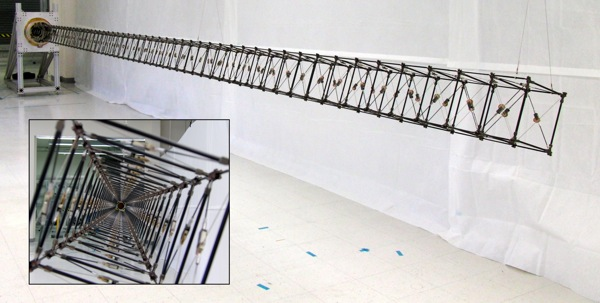
NuSTAR's mast deployed on Earth; the inset is looking down the structure

Each focusing optic has its own focal plane module, consisting of a solid state cadmium zinc telluride (CdZnTe) pixel detector surrounded by a cesium iodide (CsI) anti-coincidence shield. One detector unit — or focal plane — comprises four (two-by-two) detectors, manufactured by eV Products. Each detector is a rectangular crystal of dimension 20 × 20 mm (0.79 × 0.79 in) and thickness ~2 mm (0.079 in) that have been gridded into 32 × 32 × 0.6 mm (1.260 × 1.260 × 0.024 in) pixels (each pixel subtending 12.3 arcseconds) and provides a total of 12 arcminutes field of view (FoV) for each focal plane module.

The cadmium zinc telluride (CdZnTe) detectors are state of the art room temperature semiconductors that are very efficient at turning high energy photons into electrons. The electrons are digitally recorded using custom application-specific integrated circuits (ASICs) designed by the NuSTAR California Institute of Technology (CalTech) Focal Plane Team. Each pixel has an independent discriminator and individual X-ray interactions trigger the readout process. On-board processors, one for each telescope, identify the row and column with the largest pulse height and read out pulse height information from this pixel as well as its eight neighbors. The event time is recorded to an accuracy of 2 μs relative to the on-board clock. The event location, energy, and depth of interaction in the detector are computed from the nine-pixel signals.

The focal planes are shielded by cesium iodide (CsI) crystals that surround the detector housings. The crystal shields, grown by Saint-Gobain, register high energy photons and cosmic rays which cross the focal plane from directions other than the along the NuSTAR optical axis. Such events are the primary background for NuSTAR and must be properly identified and subtracted in order to identify high energy photons from cosmic sources. The NuSTAR active shielding ensures that any CZT detector event coincident with an active shield event is ignored.

== Major scientific results ==
NuSTAR has made many discoveries in a wide variety of areas of astrophysical research since its launch.

=== Spin measurement of a supermassive black hole ===
In February 2013, NASA revealed that NuSTAR, along with the XMM-Newton space observatory, has measured the spin rate of the supermassive black hole at the center of the galaxy NGC 1365. By measuring the frequency change of X-ray light emitted from the black hole corona, NuSTAR was able to view material from the corona be drawn closer to the event horizon. This caused inner portions of the black hole's accretion disk to be illuminated with X-rays, allowing this elusive region to be studied by astronomers for spin rates.

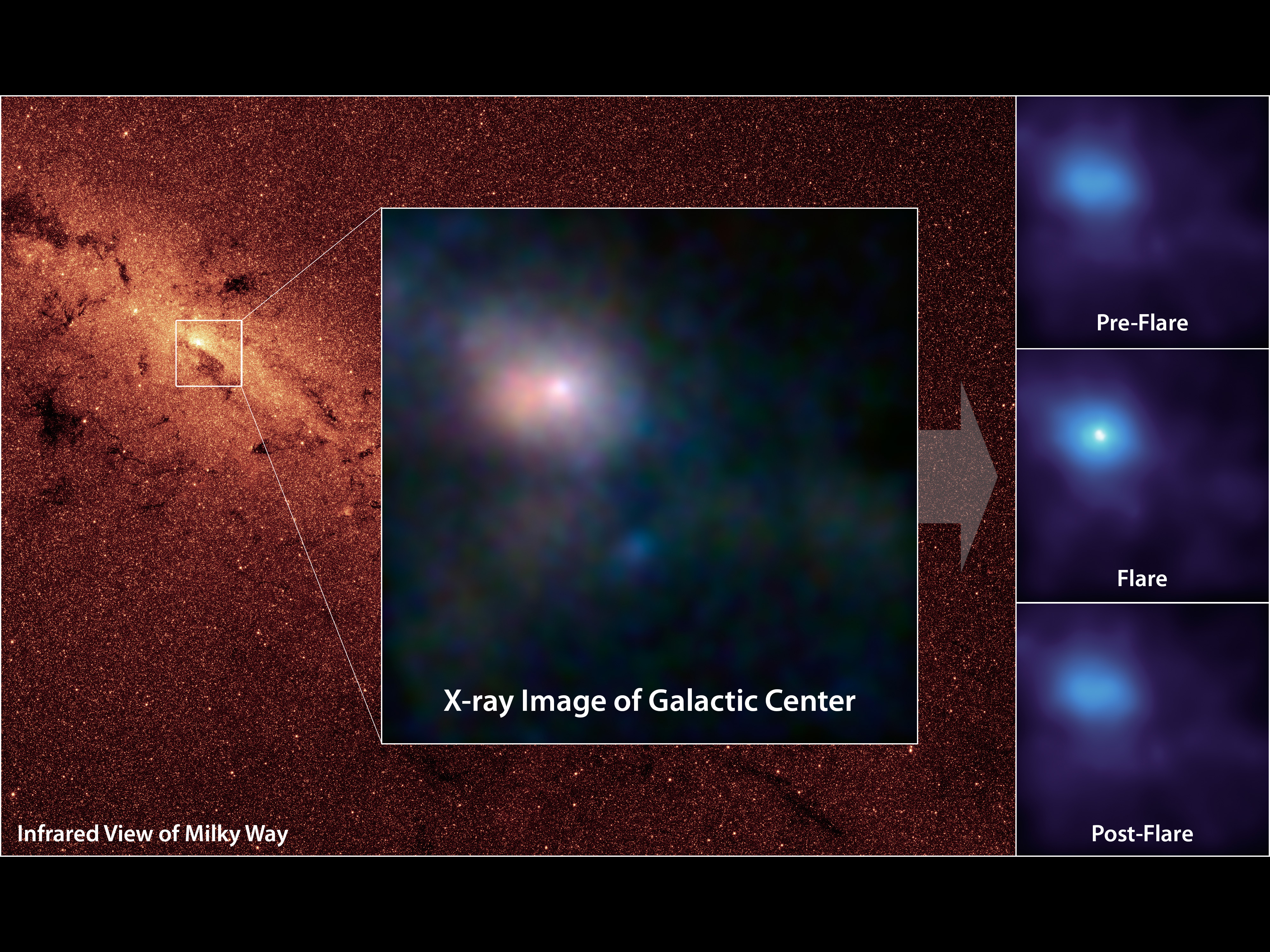
NuSTAR has captured these first, focused views of the supermassive black hole at the heart of our galaxy in high-energy X-ray light.

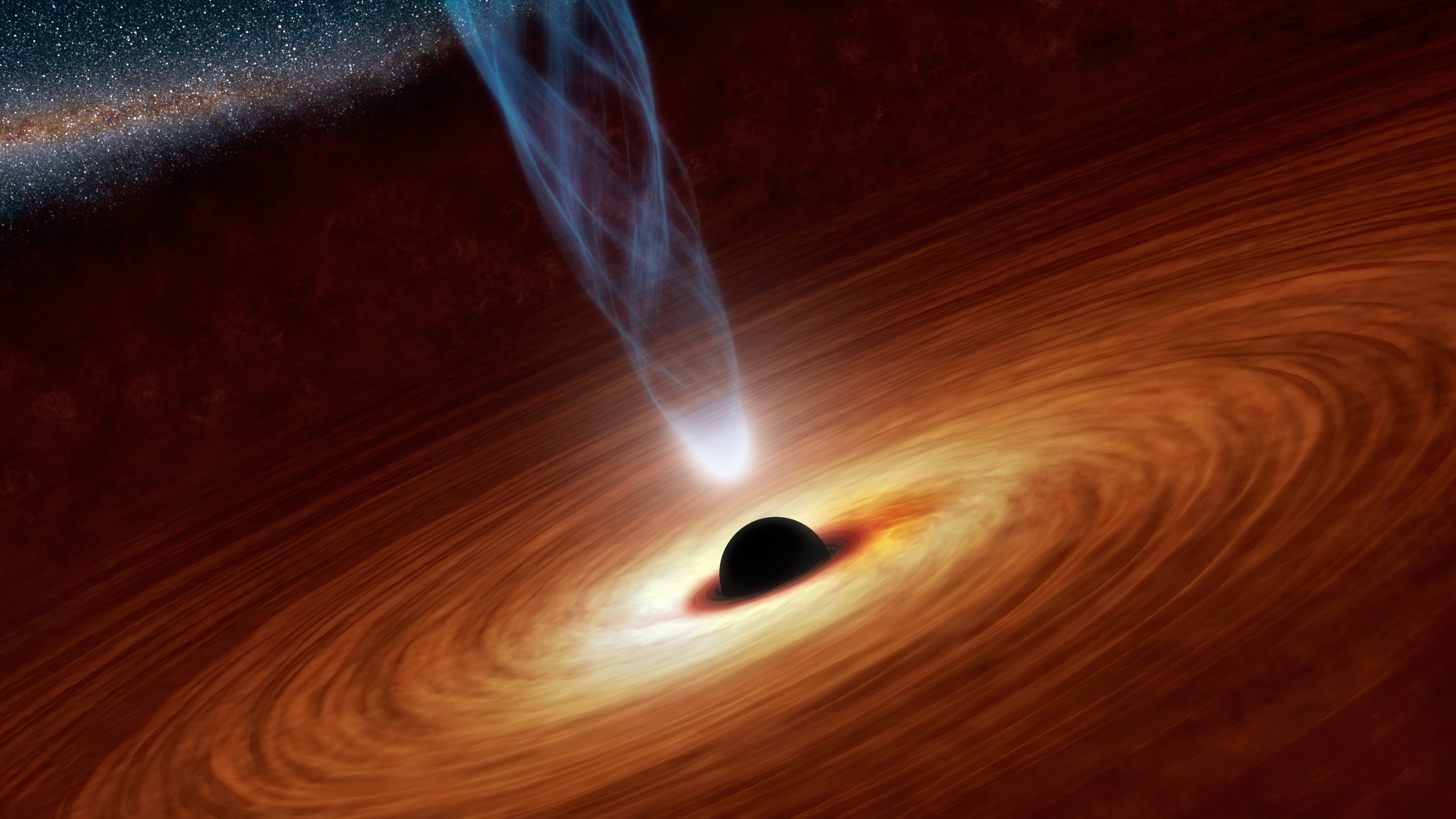
Black hole with corona, an X-ray source
(artist's concept)

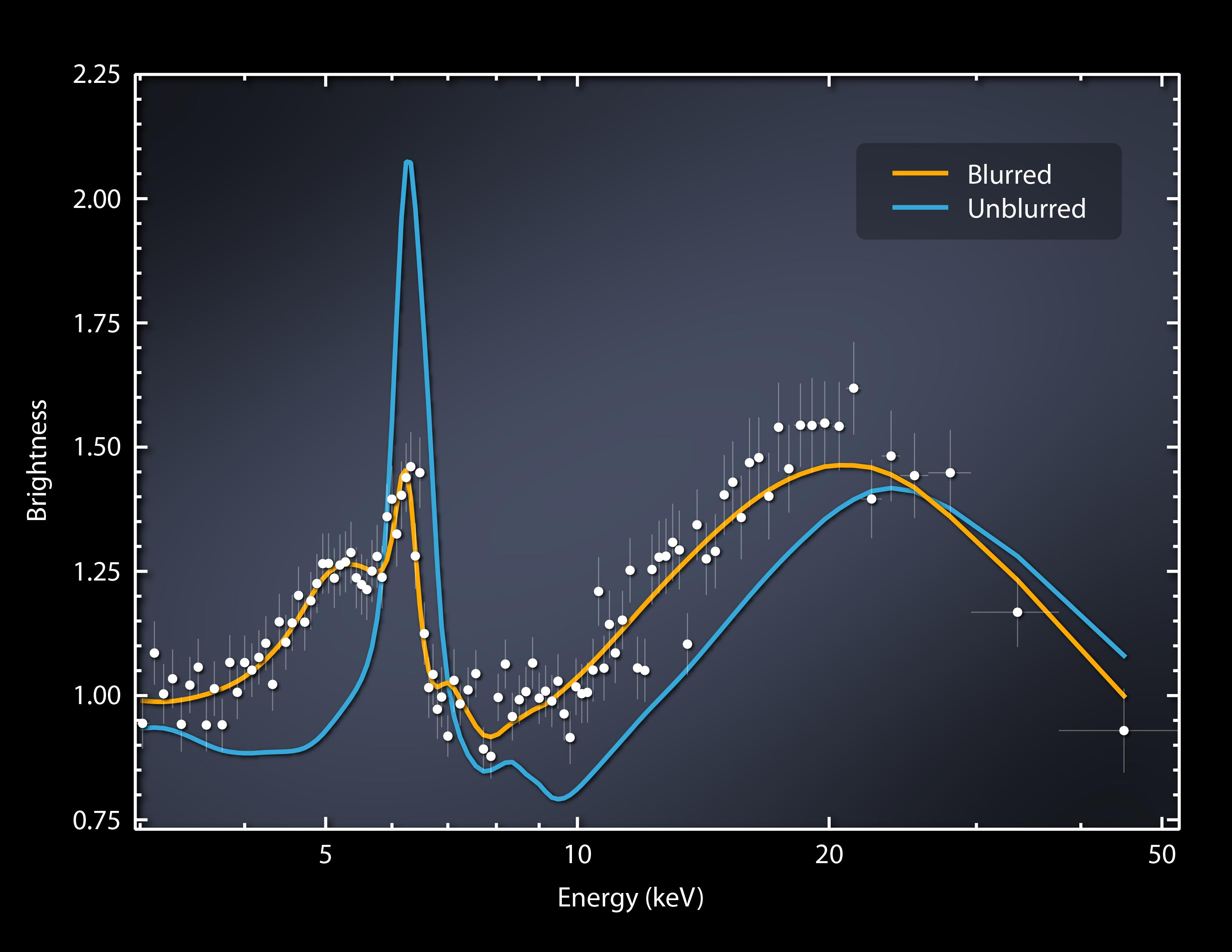
Blurring of X-rays near black hole
(NuSTAR; 12 August 2014)

=== Tracing radioactivity in a supernova remnant ===
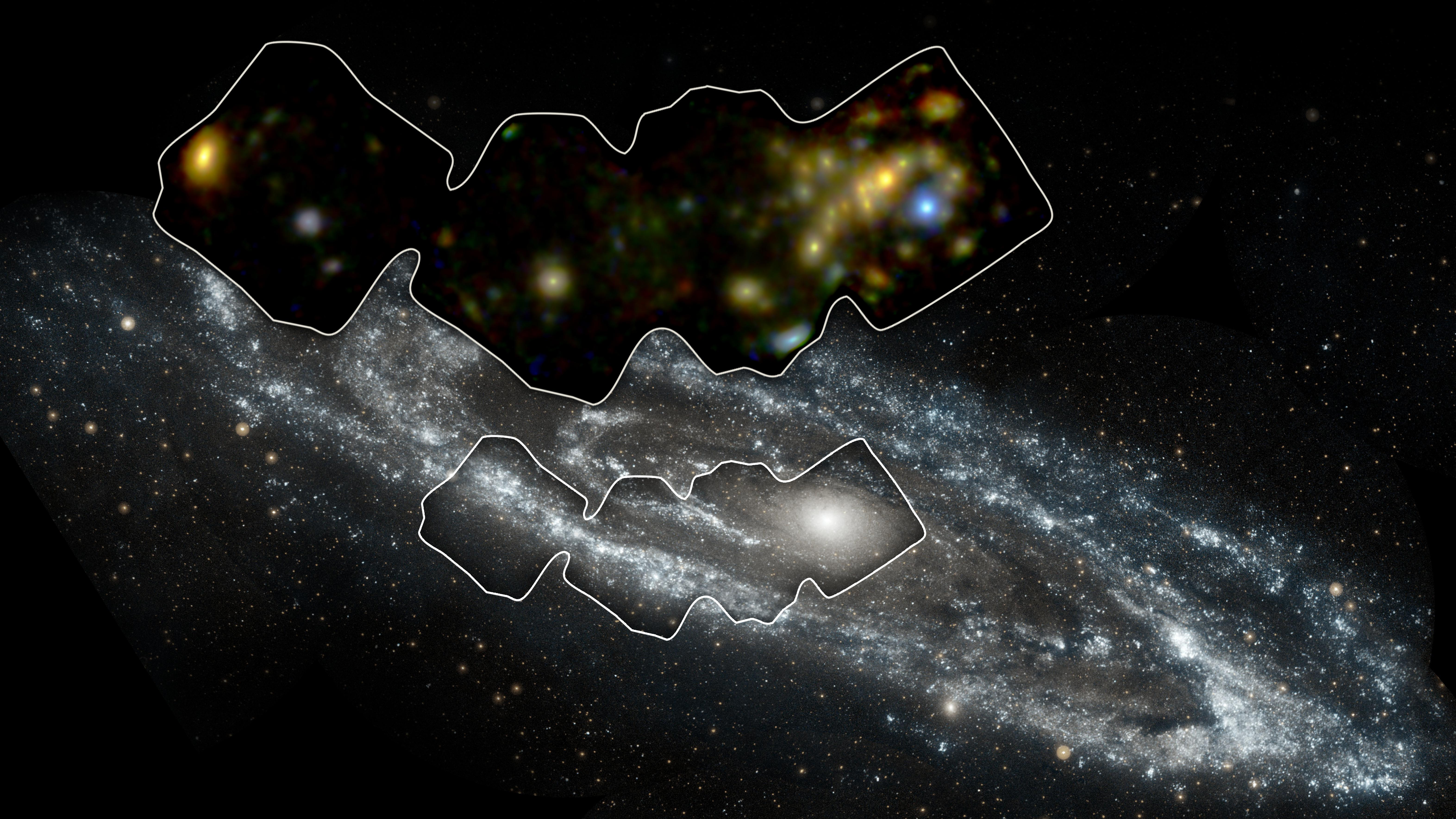
Andromeda

One of NuSTAR's main goals is to characterize stars' explosions by mapping the radioactive material in a supernova remnants. The NuSTAR map of Cassiopeia A shows the titanium-44 isotope concentrated in clumps at the remnant's center and points to a possible solution to the mystery of how the star exploded. When researchers simulate supernova blasts with computers, as a massive star dies and collapses, the main shock wave often stalls and the star fails to shatter. The latest findings strongly suggest the exploding star literally sloshed around, re-energizing the stalled shock wave and allowing the star to finally blast off its outer layers.

=== Nearby supermassive black holes ===
In January 2017, researchers from Durham University and the University of Southampton, leading a coalition of agencies using NuSTAR data, announced the discovery of supermassive black holes at the center of nearby galaxies NGC 1448 and IC 3639.

=== Measurement of temperature variations of AGN wind ===
On 2 March 2017, NuSTAR published an article to Nature detailing observations of wind temperature variations around AGN IRAS 13224−3809. By detecting periodic absences of absorption lines in the X-ray spectrum from the accretion disk winds, NuSTAR and XMM-Newton observed heating and cooling cycles of the relativistic winds leaving the accretion disk.

=== Detection of light reflecting behind a black hole ===
This representation of a black hole shows both sides of the accretion disk: in this case, gas above and below the black event horizon is from behind the black hole, while gas flowing in front is from the observer's side.

NuSTAR and XMM-Newton detected X-rays emitted behind the supermassive black hole within Seyfert 1 galaxy I Zwicky 1. Upon studying the flashes of light emitted by the corona of the black hole, researchers noticed that some detected light arrived to the detector later than the rest, with a corresponding change in frequency. The Stanford University team of scientists that led the study concluded that this change was directly attributable to radiation from the flash reflecting off of the accretion disk on the opposing side of the black hole. The path of this reflected light was bent by the high spacetime curvature, directed to the detector after the initial flash.

=== Ultra-luminous neutron star violating the Eddington limit ===
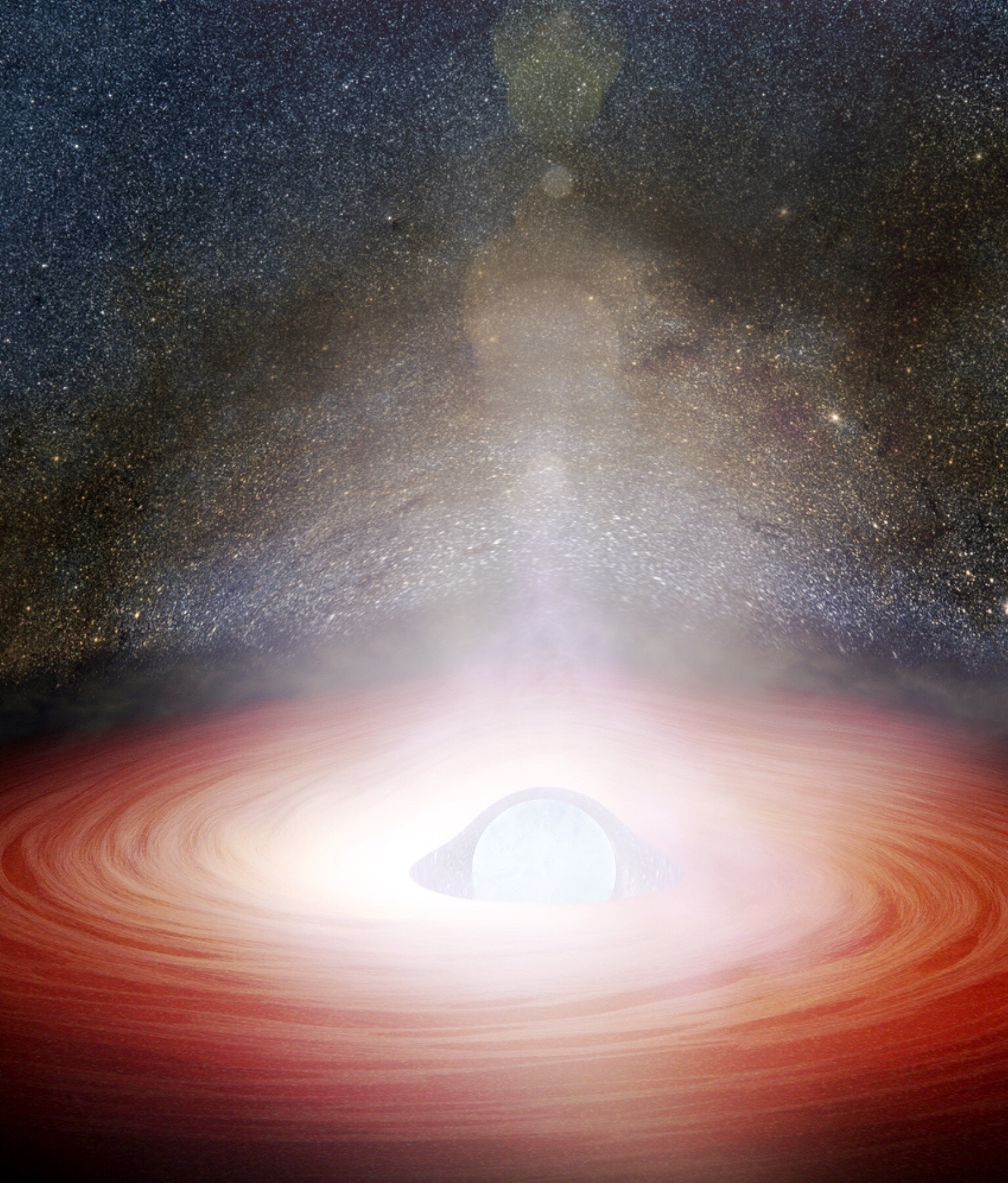
A neutron star surrounded by an accretion disk. Disk material that falls on to the surface of the star will release x-rays as radiation, contributing to the observed luminosity. When this luminosity is greater than what the Eddington limit predicts from the star mass, this object is known as a Ultraluminous X-ray source (ULX).

On 6 April 2023, the NuSTAR team confirmed that neutron star M82 X-2 was emitting more radiation than was physically thought possible due to the Eddington limit, officially labeling it as an Ultraluminous X-ray source (ULX).

== See also ==
- Explorer program
- Gravity and Extreme Magnetism, hard X-ray telescope measuring polarization (cancelled 2012)
- James Webb Space Telescope, infrared telescope launched on 25 December 2021
- XRISM, joint Japanese and American X-ray telescope
- List of X-ray space telescopes
