= David H. Clark =

New Zealand-born British astronomer (1943–2025)

David H. Clark OBE
- Born: 1943; New Zealand
- Died: 2 September 2025 (aged 81)
- Education: Victoria University of Wellington (BSc, PhD)
- Occupation: Astronomer

David Hamilton Clark OBE (1943 – 2 September 2025) was a New Zealand-born British astronomer.

Clark specialised in the study of supernova remnants using astronomical surveys at the Molonglo Observatory Synthesis Telescope in Australia. He was responsible for associating the microquasar SS 433 with the supernova remnant Westerhout 50.

== Career ==
David Clark held a number of positions in the administration of UK science: Head of Space Astronomy at the Rutherford Appleton Laboratory; Director of Programmes at the Science and Engineering Research Council (SERC); and Director of Research and Innovation at the Engineering and Physical Sciences research Council (EPSRC).

In the 2001 Queen's Birthday Honours, Clark was appointed an Officer of the Order of the British Empire.

== History of science ==
Clark researched the life of Stephen Gray and co-authored, with his son Stephen, a popular book on the subject. He was the inaugural Stephen Gray Lecturer.

Clark died at home on 2 September 2025, at the age of 81.
