= NGC 1418 =

Galaxy in the constellation Eridanus

- NGC 1418 imaged by Legacy Surveys

Observation data (J2000 epoch)
- Constellation: Eridanus
- Right ascension: 03^{h} 42^{m} 16.1773^{s}
- Declination: −04° 43′ 51.406″
- Redshift: 0.014023±0.0000200
- Heliocentric radial velocity: 4,204±6 km/s
- Distance: 213.91 ± 26.41 Mly (65.586 ± 8.097 Mpc)
- Group or cluster: NGC 1417 group (LGG 103)
- Apparent magnitude (V): 14.21

Characteristics
- Type: SB(s)b
- Size: ~100,800 ly (30.91 kpc) (estimated)
- Apparent size (V): 1.3′ × 0.9′

Other designations
- HOLM 70B, 2MASX J03421615-0443505, MCG -01-10-022, PGC 13606

NGC 1418 is a barred spiral galaxy in the constellation of Eridanus. Its velocity with respect to the cosmic microwave background is 4,068±11 km/s, which corresponds to a Hubble distance of 195.7 ± 13.7 Mly (59.99 ± 4.20 Mpc). However, seven non-redshift measurements give a farther mean distance of 213.91 ± 26.41 Mly (65.586 ± 8.097 Mpc). It was discovered by German-British astronomer William Herschel on 5 October 1785.

NGC 1418 has a possible active galactic nucleus, i.e. it has a compact region at the center of a galaxy that emits a significant amount of energy across the electromagnetic spectrum, with characteristics indicating that this luminosity is not produced by the stars.

== NGC 1417 group ==
NGC 1418 is a member of the NGC 1417 galaxy group (also known as LGG 103). This group contains at least 14 galaxies, including NGC 1358, NGC 1376, NGC 1417, NGC 1441, NGC 1449, NGC 1451, and NGC 1453.

== Supernovae ==
Three supernovae have been observed in NGC 1418:

- SN 2013gy (Type Ia, mag. 18) was discovered by the Lick Observatory Supernova Search (LOSS) on 6 December 2013.
- SN 2026zyh (Type Ia, mag. 18.3483) was discovered by the Zwicky Transient Facility on 26 August 2026.
- SN 2026aadx (Type II-P, mag. 19.39) was discovered by GOTO on 25 August 2026.

== See also ==
- List of NGC objects (1001–2000)
