= Edward Spiegel =

American physicist

Edward A. Spiegel
- Edward Spiegal
- Born: March 7 1931
- Died: January 2, 2020 (aged 88)
- Education: University of Michigan
- Known for: Convection Theory; Astrophysical Fluid Dynamics
- Scientific career
- Fields: Mathematical physicist
- Workplaces: Columbia University
- Thesis: The onset of thermal convection in a radiating atmosphere (1958)
- Doctoral advisor: Mahinder Singh Uberoi

Edward A. Spiegel (1931 — January 2, 2020) was an American professor of astronomy at Columbia University. He worked on convection theory and on the application of fluid dynamics to astrophysics.

== Early life and career ==
Spiegel grew up in New York City in the South Bronx with his Yiddish-speaking eastern European parents and his sister, Jeanette. In 1948, he graduated from DeWitt-Clinton High School and went on to attend UCLA as an undergraduate. After finishing his bachelor's degree, he earned a Ph.D. at the University of Michigan, where he met his wife, Barbara. They eventually married and were together until her death in 2011. He taught at University of California, Berkeley and then moved to Princeton University to carry out research there with Robert Kraichnan. In 1959, he helped establish the summer Geophysical Fluid Dynamics program for the Woods Hole Oceanographic Institution and was a member of the physical oceanography department there until his death. In 1965, Spiegel moved to the Courant Institute at New York University and was promoted to professor of physics in 1967. He then moved to Columbia University in 1969, apparently due to a conflict with a dean over how early in the morning his classes would meet. He worked as a professor of astronomy at Columbia for the rest of his career, retiring as Professor Emeritus. He also taught classes at Cooper Union and served on the staff of the American Museum of Natural History.

== Contributions ==
In the 1960s his research focused on turbulence and on chaos theory, returning to mathematical aspects of that subject from 1975 to 1985. In the late 1980s he concentrated on mathematical pattern theory in fluids and other systems. Afterwards, Spiegel's work focused on models of the solar cycle and radiative processes in hot stars. He authored or co-authored more than 100 papers involving collaborations with over 60 individuals; these papers have been cited well in excess of 3000 times.

His 1966 article entitled "A thermally excited non-linear oscillator," co-authored with D.W. Moore, contains a discussion of chaotic dynamics in terms of the wandering of a trajectory from the vicinity of one unstable periodic orbit to another. This anticipated much of our present day understanding of strange attractors. Like Edward Lorenz's famous paper, which appeared just a few years earlier, this paper provided one of the first models that showed how simple fluid systems can display complex dynamics.

"Cosmic Arrhythmias" in "Chaos in Astrophysics" (Reidel 1985) is a compendium of Edward Spiegel's ideas for rationalizing cosmic phenomena. The article talks about the philosophy of why low-dimensional systems are relevant, useful and important in astrophysics. Between the lines, is the understanding that these ideas extend well beyond the subject of astrophysics. The work also cites some specific cosmic examples where low-dimensional dynamics and chaos theory may provide a key to understanding the astrophysical phenomena.

His insights and ideas have had a long-term effect on astrophysics. For example, Spiegel's work on vortices in disks led to many papers in the 1990s, with vortices now recognized as key ingredients to the mechanisms by which disks maintain an accretion flux and how planets are able to form. His work on photo-hydrodynamics is now recognized as potentially important in pulsars, and the Moore-Spiegel oscillator and chaos have become influential ideas since the 1980s. He also coined the field's use of the terms "blazar" and "photon bubble".

== Awards ==
Spiegel was the Lewis Morris Rutherfurd Professor of Astronomy at Columbia University. He was awarded a Guggenheim Fellowship in 1974.
