= NGC 2782 =

Galaxy in the constellation Lynx

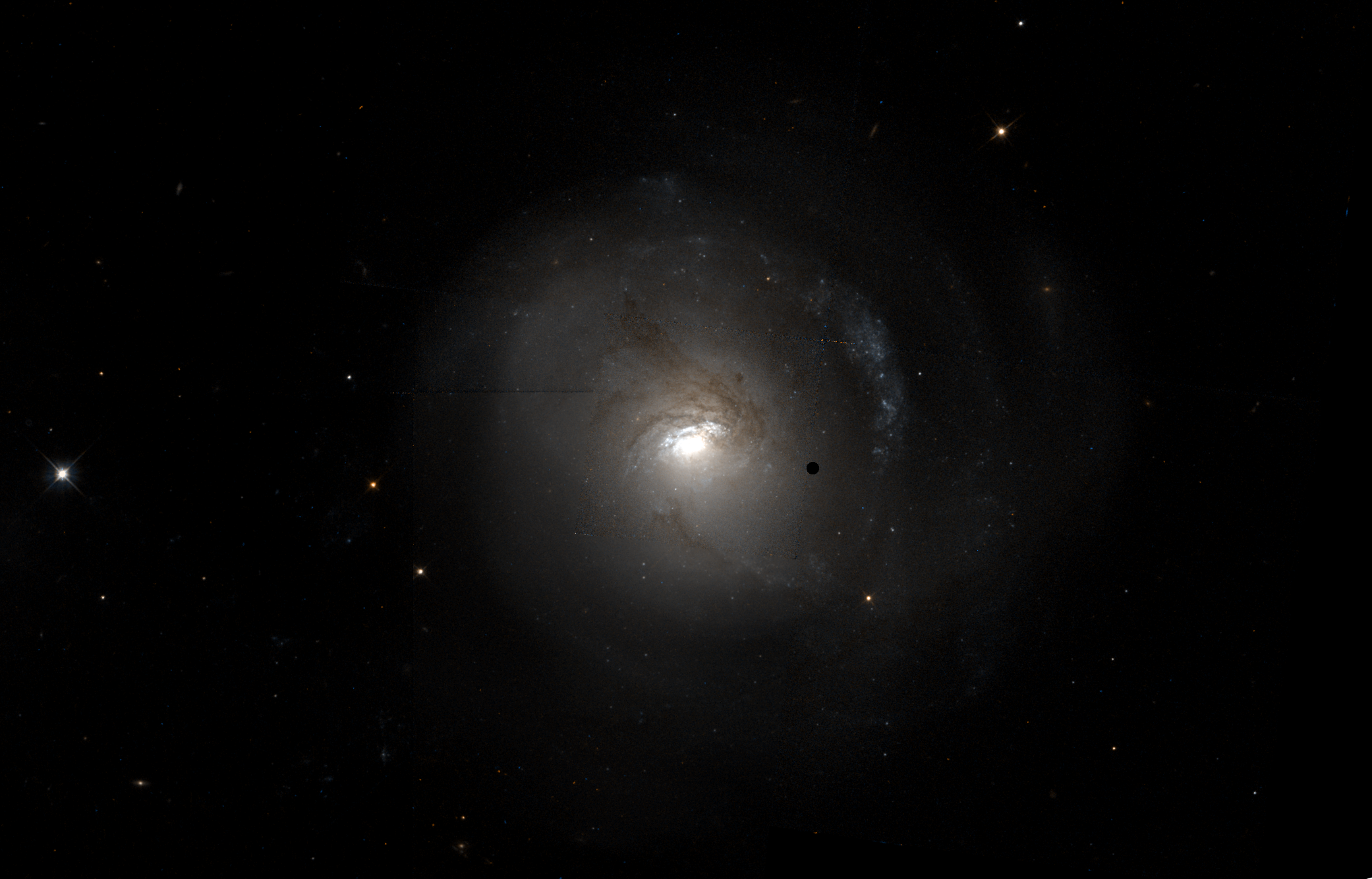
- NGC 2782 imaged by the Hubble Space Telescope

Observation data (J2000 epoch)
- Constellation: Lynx
- Right ascension: 08^{h} 53^{m} 32.7^{s}
- Declination: 51° 18′ 49″
- Redshift: 2,543±2 km/s
- Distance: 76 ± 35 Mly (23.4 ± 10.6 Mpc)
- Apparent magnitude (V): 11.4

Characteristics
- Type: SAB(rs)a
- Apparent size (V): 3.7′ × 2.4′

Other designations
- NGC 2782, Arp 215, UGC 4862, MCG +07-19-036, PGC 26034, 6C B091051.3+401928

NGC 2782 is a peculiar spiral galaxy that formed after a galaxy merger in the northern constellation of Lynx. The galaxy lies 75 million light years away from Earth, which means, given its apparent dimensions, that NGC 2782 is approximately 100,000 light years across. It was discovered by German-British astronomer William Herschel on 18 March 1787.

NGC 2782 has an active galactic nucleus and it is a starburst and a type 1 Seyfert galaxy. NGC 2782 is mentioned in the Atlas of Peculiar Galaxies in the category galaxies with adjacent loops.

== Structure ==
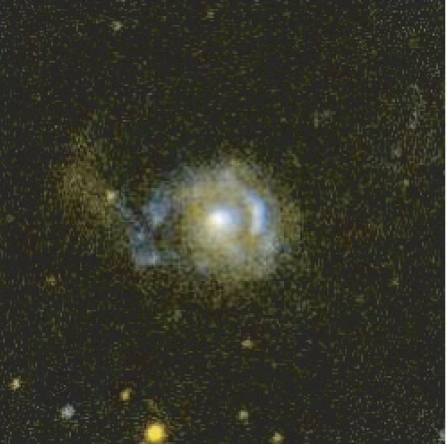
NGC 2782 by GALEX

=== Active galactic nucleus ===
The nucleus and circumnuclear region of NGC 2782 display starburst activity, with bar of the galaxy providing gas to the nucleus. The active galactic nucleus is hidden by a compact high-column-density absorber and a H_{2}O maser is associated with it. The vigorous star formation creates an unusual "superwind" of out-flowing gas, which has been detected in X-rays as a bubble like structure, approximately 7 arcsec south of the central region of the galaxy. A similar bubble can be seen in radiowaves at the north side. There is also diffuse X-rays emission. The nucleus of NGC 2782 is a low luminosity active galactic nucleus.

=== Tidal tails ===
NGC 2782 shows two tidal tails, extending in opposite directions. As depicted in HI imaging, a plume extends about 5 arcmin toward the northwest, with an estimated mass of 1.4×10^{9} M_{☉} of atomic hydrogen, accounting for about 40 percent of the total HI mass of the system. A shorter HI plume extending toward the east has been associated with the stellar tail which extends 2.7 arcmin toward the east in the optical images. The northwest tail is fainter in the optical spectrum. CO was detected in the eastern tail, underlying the presence of molecular gas and HII regions in the region, with total mass of 6×10^{8} M_{☉} or even more. There is star formation activity in the eastern tail. In the western tail, 7 UV sources have been detected. These stellar populations are 1 to 11 million years old. Three of them have high metallicity, similar to that of the nucleus of the galaxy.

=== Ultraluminous X-ray sources ===
Via observations by the Chandra X-ray Observatory, 27 X-ray point sources, of which 13 are ultraluminous X-ray sources (without counting the central one), were observed near the nucleus and are likely associated with the galaxy. This number is unusually high for a galaxy, although ultraluminous X-ray sources are common in starburst galaxies. Sixteen of these sources have a visual counterpart.

== Supernovae ==
Two supernovae have been observed in NGC 2782.

- SN 1994ak (Type IIn, mag. 16.3) was discovered by Reiki Kushida on 24 December 1994.
- SN 2020scc (Type Ia, mag. 13.7) was discovered by Quanzhi Ye and Xing Gao on 20 August 2020.

== Nearby galaxies ==
NGC 2782 is the largest galaxy in a small group of four galaxies. Nearby galaxies include UGC 4867 and UGC 4871, and further away lie NGC 2785 and UGC 4889.
