= M82 X-1 =

Suspected black hole

Observation data Epoch J2000.0 Equinox ICRS
- Constellation: Ursa Major
- Right ascension: 09^{h} 55^{m} 50.01^{s}
- Declination: 69° 40′ 46.0″

Database references
SIMBAD	data

M82 X-1 is an ultra-luminous X-ray source located in the galaxy M82. It is a candidate intermediate-mass black hole, with the exact mass estimate varying from around 100 to 1000 solar masses. One of the most luminous ULXs ever known, its luminosity exceeds the Eddington limit for a stellar mass object.

In 2003 Strohmayer and Mushotzky used data from the XMM Newton Satellite to determine that M82 X-1 had a 54 mHz periodic x-ray signal, revealing that X-1 could be an intermediate-mass black hole. Then from 2004 to 2010 NASA's Rossi X-Ray Timing Explorer (RXTE) gathered about 800 observations of X-1. Using the gathered data, in August of 2014 Dheeraj Pasham, Strohmayer, and Mushotzky published an article that stated their mass estimates for X-1 to be 428 ± 105, which is the most accurate estimation we have.

Due to both objects being located in M82 and both objects being part of binary systems (or possibly being in one), it could be confused that M82 X-1 and M82 X-2 are part of the same binary systems. This is not the case however, as even though they are only about 5 arcseconds apart in the sky and are often studied together, they are part of two completely separate systems.

== See also ==
- M82 X-2
