= M82 X-2 =

X-ray pulsar located in the galaxy Messier 82

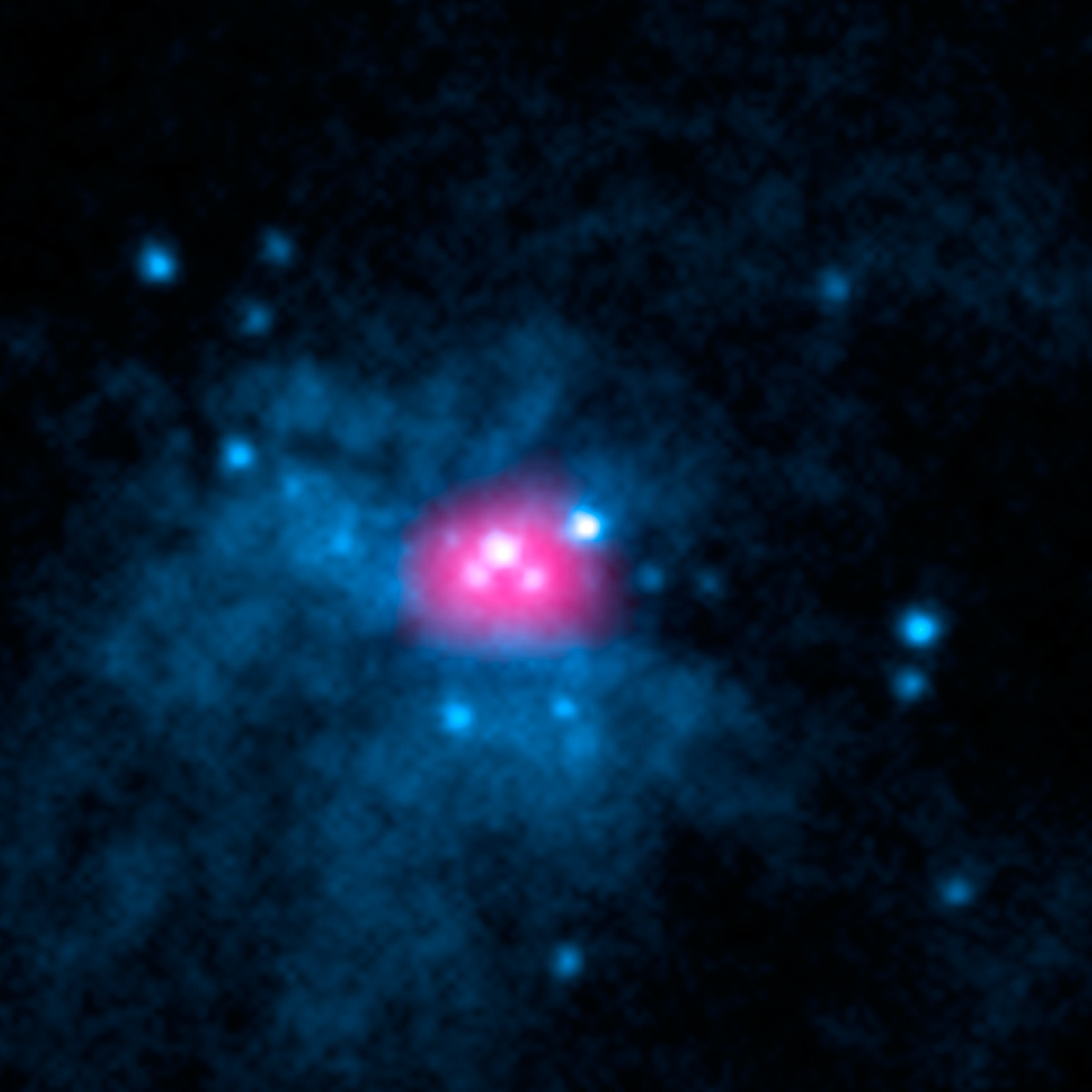
- M82 X-2 glows pink in the X-ray spectrum at the center of Messier 82. M82 X-1 is to its right.

Observation data Epoch J2000.0 Equinox ICRS
- Constellation: Ursa Major
- Right ascension: 09^{h} 55^{m} 51.0^{s}
- Declination: 69° 40′ 45″

Astrometry
Distance	12 million ly (3.5 million pc)

Other designations
- CXOU J095550.9+694044, NuSTAR J095551+6940.8

Database references
SIMBAD	data

M82 X-2 is an X-ray pulsar located in the galaxy Messier 82, approximately 12 million light-years from Earth. It is exceptionally luminous, radiating energy equivalent to approximately ten million Suns. This object is part of a binary system: If the pulsar is of an average size, 1.4 M_{☉}, then its companion is at least 5.2 M_{☉}. On average, the pulsar rotates every 1.37 seconds, and revolves around its more massive companion every 2.5 days.

M82 X-2 is an ultraluminous X-ray source (ULX), shining about 100 times brighter than theory suggests something of its mass should be able to. Its brightness is many times higher than the Eddington limit, a basic physics guideline that sets an upper limit on the brightness that an object of a given mass should be able to achieve. Possible explanations for violations of the Eddington limit include geometrical effects arising from the funneling of in-falling material along magnetic field lines.

While M82 X-2 was previously known as an X-ray source, it was not until an observation campaign to study the newly discovered supernova SN 2014J in January 2014 that X-2's true nature was uncovered. Scientists looking at data from the NuSTAR spacecraft noticed a pulsing in the X-ray spectrum coming from near the supernova in Messier 82. Data from the Chandra and Swift spacecraft was used to verify the NuSTAR findings and provide the necessary spatial resolution to determine the exact source. After combining the NuSTAR and Chandra data, scientists were able to discern that M82 X-2 emitted both an X-ray beam and continuous broad X-ray radiation. LXs). In 2023 new NuSTAR data confirmed that it exceeded the Eddington limit.

It has been discovered that X-2 is experiencing an orbital decay at a rate of P = -(5.69 ± 0.24) x 10^-8 s s^-1. This decay rate relates to a loss of about 36km a year in circumference. This rate of decay would imply that X-2 is stripping mass from its companion at a rate of over 1.5 Earths a year.

== See also ==
- M82 X-1

== Bibliography ==
- Bachetti, M.; Harrison, F. A.; Walton, D. J.; Grefenstette, B. W.; Chakrabarty, D.; et al. (9 October 2014). "An ultraluminous X-ray source powered by an accreting neutron star". Nature. 514 (7521): 202–204. arXiv:1410.3590. Bibcode:2014Natur.514..202B. doi:10.1038/nature13791. PMID 25297433. S2CID 4390221.
