= Eddington luminosity =

Astrophysical limit on radiation from stars

The Eddington luminosity, also referred to as the Eddington limit, is the maximum luminosity a body (such as a star) can achieve when there is balance between the force of radiation acting outward and the gravitational force acting inward. The state of balance is called hydrostatic equilibrium. When a star exceeds the Eddington luminosity, it will initiate a very intense radiation-driven stellar wind from its outer layers.

Originally, Sir Arthur Eddington took only the electron scattering into account when calculating this limit, something that now is called the classical Eddington limit. Nowadays, the modified Eddington limit also takes into account other radiation processes such as bound–free and free–free radiation interaction.

== Derivation ==
The maximum possible luminosity of a source in hydrostatic equilibrium is the Eddington luminosity. If the luminosity exceeds the Eddington limit, then the radiation pressure drives an outflow. The limit is obtained by setting the outward radiation pressure equal to the inward gravitational force. Both forces decrease by inverse-square laws, so once equality is reached, the hydrodynamic flow is the same throughout the star.

From Euler's equation in hydrostatic equilibrium, the mean acceleration is zero,

$$\frac{d u}{d t}  = - \frac{\nabla p}{\rho} - \nabla \Phi = 0$$

where $u$ is the velocity, $p$ is the pressure, $\rho$ is the density, and $\Phi$ is the gravitational potential. If the pressure is dominated by radiation pressure associated with a radiative energy flux $F_{\rm rad}$,

$$-\frac{\nabla p}{\rho} = \frac{\kappa}{c} F_{\rm rad}\,.$$

Here $\kappa$ is the opacity of the stellar material, defined as the fraction of radiation energy flux absorbed by the medium per unit density and unit length. For ionized hydrogen, $\kappa=\sigma_{\rm T}/m_{\rm p}$, where $\sigma_{\rm T}$ is the Thomson scattering cross-section for the electron and $m_{\rm p}$ is the mass of a proton. Note that $F_{\rm rad}=d^2E/dAdt$ is defined as the energy flux over a surface, which can be expressed with the momentum flux using $E=pc$ for radiation. Therefore, the rate of momentum transfer from the radiation to the gaseous medium per unit density is $\kappa F_{\rm rad}/c$, which explains the right-hand side of the above equation.

The luminosity of a source bounded by a surface $S$ may be expressed with these relations as

$$L = \int_S F_{\rm rad} \cdot dS = \int_S \frac{c}{\kappa} \nabla \Phi \cdot dS\,.$$

Now assuming that the opacity is a constant, it can be brought outside the integral. Using Gauss's theorem and Poisson's equation gives

$$L = \frac{c}{\kappa} \int_S \nabla \Phi \cdot dS = \frac{c}{\kappa} \int_V \nabla^2 \Phi \, dV = \frac{4 \pi G  c}{\kappa} \int_V \rho \, dV  = \frac{4 \pi G M  c}{\kappa}$$

where $M$ is the mass of the central object. This result is called the Eddington luminosity. The mass of the proton appears because, in the typical environment for the outer layers of a star, the radiation pressure acts on electrons, which are driven away from the center. Because protons are negligibly pressured by the analog of Thomson scattering, due to their larger mass, the result is to create a slight charge separation and therefore a radially directed electric field, acting to lift the positive charges, which, under the conditions in stellar atmospheres, typically are free protons. When the outward electric field is sufficient to levitate the protons against gravity, both electrons and protons are expelled together.

The formula can be expressed in terms of solar mass, $M_\bigodot$, and solar luminosity,$L_\bigodot$ as:
$$\frac{L_\mathrm{E}}{L_\bigodot} = 1.3\times 10^4 \frac{1}{\kappa}\frac{M}{M_\bigodot}.$$
When the radiation pressure is dominated by photon-electron scattering, the opacity can be approximated by $\kappa = 0.20(1+X)$ for a gas with mass fraction $X$. For pure ionized hydrogen, $X = 0.7$ giving
$$\frac{L_\mathrm{E}}{L_\bigodot}
= 3.2\times10^4\left(\frac{M}{M_\bigodot}\right)$$

A star's proximity to the Eddington limit can be characterized by its Eddington parameter, $\Lambda_e$, the ratio of its actual luminosity $L$ to the limit $L_\mathrm{E}$:
$$\Lambda_E = 10^{-4.5} q_e \frac{L/L_\bigodot}{M/M_\bigodot}$$
where $q_e$ is the average number of electrons per atomic mass unit in the gas. The numerator here is the star's relative luminosity driving gas off the star and the denominator gives its relative gravitational strength pulling the gas in.

=== Different limits for different materials ===
The derivation above for the outward light pressure assumes a hydrogen plasma. In other circumstances the pressure balance can be different from what it is for hydrogen.

In an evolved star with a pure helium atmosphere, the electric field would have to lift a helium nucleus (an alpha particle), with nearly 4 times the mass of a proton, while the radiation pressure would act on 2 free electrons. Thus twice the usual Eddington luminosity would be needed to drive off an atmosphere of pure helium.

At very high temperatures, as in the environment of a black hole or neutron star, high-energy photons can interact with nuclei, or even with other photons, to create an electron–positron plasma. In that situation the combined mass of the positive–negative charge carrier pair is approximately 918 times smaller (half of the proton-to-electron mass ratio), while the radiation pressure on the positrons doubles the effective upward force per unit mass, so the limiting luminosity needed is reduced by a factor of ≈ 918×2.

The exact value of the Eddington luminosity depends on the chemical composition of the gas layer and the spectral energy distribution of the emission. A gas with cosmological abundances of hydrogen and helium is much more transparent than gas with solar abundance ratios. Atomic line transitions can greatly increase the effects of radiation pressure, and line-driven winds exist in some bright stars (e.g., Wolf–Rayet and O-type stars). As massive stars evolve the ratio of their luminosity to their mass increases. When they reach an Eddington parameter close to unity, strong stellar winds from radiation pressure expel the outer hydrogen rich layer, leaving these stars to appear helium enriched.

The role of the Eddington limit in today's research lies in explaining the very high mass loss rates seen in, for example, the series of outbursts of η Carinae in 1840–1860. The regular, line-driven stellar winds can only explain a mass loss rate of around 10^{−4}~10^{−3} solar masses per year, whereas losses of up to 1/ 2 solar mass per year are needed to understand the η Carinae outbursts. This can be done with the help of the super-Eddington winds driven by broad-spectrum radiation.

== Super-Eddington accretion ==
Accretion at rates significantly above the Eddington limit, eg $\approx 10 L_\textrm{Edd}/c^2,$ are called super-Eddington accretion. The emergent luminosity from such accretion flow saturates at a few times $L_\textrm{Edd}$ due to photon trapping, where photons created by accretion processes are reabsorbed by the dense flow.

Gamma-ray bursts, novae and supernovae are examples of systems exceeding their Eddington luminosity by a large factor for very short times, resulting in short and highly intensive mass loss rates. Some X-ray binaries and active galaxies are able to maintain luminosities close to the Eddington limit for very long times. For accretion-powered sources such as accreting neutron stars or cataclysmic variables (accreting white dwarfs), the limit may act to reduce or cut off the accretion flow, imposing an Eddington limit on accretion corresponding to that on luminosity. Super-Eddington accretion onto stellar-mass black holes is one possible model for ultraluminous X-ray sources (ULXSs).

For accreting black holes, not all the energy released by accretion has to appear as outgoing luminosity, since energy can be lost through the event horizon, down the hole. Such sources effectively may not conserve energy. Then the accretion efficiency, or the fraction of energy actually radiated of that theoretically available from the gravitational energy release of accreting material, enters in an essential way.

One example of super-Eddington accretion is the radio-loud quasar ID830 (eFEDS J084222.9+0010000), detected at redshift 3.43. Observational data from magnesium-II emission line indicates a central black hole mass of approximately 440 million solar masses. Calculations derived from its X-ray luminosity indicate an Eddington ratio of roughly 12.8. ID830 has a high ratio of UV to X-ray emission suggesting a highly luminous X-ray corona and an active radio jet. The system may represents a transitional super-Eddington phase following a major accretion burst. Most similar objects are considered to be blazars rather than super-Eddington sources.

== Other factors ==
The Eddington limit is not a strict limit on the luminosity of a stellar object. The limit does not consider several potentially important factors, and super-Eddington objects have been observed that do not seem to have the predicted high mass-loss rate. Other factors that might affect the maximum luminosity of a star include:

- Porosity. A problem with steady winds driven by broad-spectrum radiation is that both the radiative flux and gravitational acceleration scale with r^{−2}. The ratio between these factors is constant, and in a super-Eddington star, the whole envelope would become gravitationally unbound at the same time. This is not observed. A possible solution is introducing an atmospheric porosity, where we imagine the stellar atmosphere to consist of denser regions surrounded by regions of lower-density gas. This would reduce the coupling between radiation and matter, and the full force of the radiation field would be seen only in the more homogeneous outer, lower-density layers of the atmosphere.
- Turbulence. A possible destabilizing factor might be the turbulent pressure arising when energy in the convection zones builds up a field of supersonic turbulence. The importance of turbulence is being debated, however.
- Photon bubbles. Another factor that might explain some stable super-Eddington objects is the photon bubble effect. Photon bubbles would develop spontaneously in radiation-dominated atmospheres when the radiation pressure exceeds the gas pressure. We can imagine a region in the stellar atmosphere with a density lower than the surroundings, but with a higher radiation pressure. Such a region would rise through the atmosphere, with radiation diffusing in from the sides, leading to an even higher radiation pressure. This effect could transport radiation more efficiently than a homogeneous atmosphere, increasing the allowed total radiation rate. Accretion discs may exhibit luminosities as high as 10–100 times the Eddington limit without experiencing instabilities.

== Humphreys–Davidson limit ==
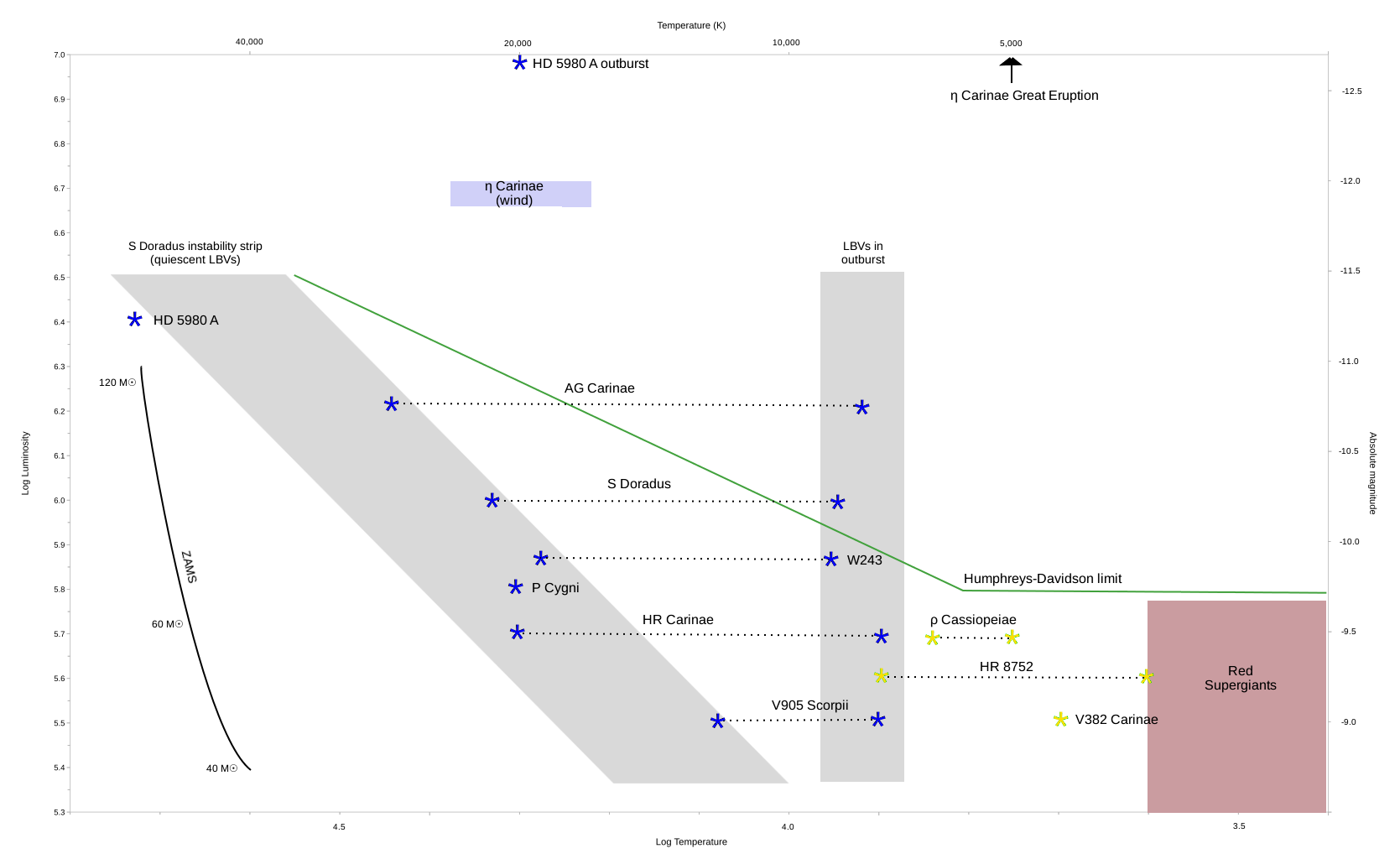
The upper H–R diagram with the empirical Humphreys-Davidson limit marked (green line). Stars are observed above the limit only during brief outbursts.

Observations of massive stars show a clear upper limit to their luminosity, termed the Humphreys–Davidson limit after the researchers who first wrote about it. Only highly unstable objects are found, temporarily, at higher luminosities. Efforts to reconcile this with the theoretical Eddington limit have been largely unsuccessful.

The H–D limit for cool supergiants is placed at around 320,000 L_{☉}.

Most luminous known K- and M-type supergiants
Name	Luminosity (L_{☉})	Effective temperature (K)	Spectral type	Notes	References
HR 5171 Aa	630,000+60,000 −50,000	4,290	K0Ia-0	This luminosity assumes a distance of 3.6 kpc, however it might be somewhat closer at nearly 3 kpc.	
NGC253-222	501,000	3,750	M0-M2	Uncertain extinction and thus uncertain luminosity.	
LGGS J013339.28+303118.8	479,000	3,837	M1Ia	Likely a foreground star.	
N6946-BH1 progenitor	429,000	3,515			
HD 269551 A	389,000	3,800	K/M		
NGC7793-34	380,000	3,840	M0-M2		
LGGS J013418.56+303808.6	363,000	3,837			
LGGS J004428.12+415502.9	339,000	–	K2I		
V538 Carinae	333,000	3,535	M3.8Ib		
NGC247-154	332,000	3,570	M2-M4		
AH Scorpii	331,000	3,682	M5Ia		
WLM 02	331,000	4,660	K2-3I		
Stephenson 2 DFK 1	321,000	3,200	M5-M6		
SMC 18592	309,000 - 355,000	4,050	K5–M0Ia		
LGGS J004539.99+415404.1	309,000	–	M3I		
LGGS J013350.62+303230.3	309,000	3,800			
HV 888	302,000	3,442–3,500	M4Ia		
RW Cephei	300,000	4,400	K2Ia-0	A K-type yellow hypergiant.	
LGGS J013358.54+303419.9	295,000	4,050			
GCIRS 7	295,000	3,600	M1I	Highly variable in terms of radius and luminosity.	
SP77 21-12	295,000	4,050	K5-M3		
EV Carinae	288,000	3,574	M4.5Ia		
HV 12463	288,000	3,550	M	Probably not a LMC member.	
LGGS J003951.33+405303.7	288,000	–			
LGGS J013352.96+303816.0	282,000	3,900			
RSGC1-F13	282,000 - 290,000	3,590 - 4,200	M3 - K2		
WOH G64	282,000	3,400	M5I	Likely one of the largest known stars.	
LGGS J004731.12+422749.1	275,000	–			
VY Canis Majoris	270,000	3,490	M3–M4.5		
LGGS J004428.48+415130.9	269,000		M1I		
RSGC1-F01	263,000 - 335,000	3,450	M5		
NGC247-155	263,000	3,510	M2-M4	Uncertain extinction and thus uncertain luminosity.	
LGGS J013241.94+302047.5	257,000	3,950			
NGC300-125	257,000	3,350	M2-M4		
Westerlund 1 W26	256,000 - 312,000	3,720 - 4,000	M0.5-M6Ia		
HD 143183	254,000	3,605	M3		
LMC 145013	251,000 - 339,000	3,950	M2.5Ia–Ib		
LMC 25320	251,000	3,800	M		
V354 Cephei	250,000	3,615	M1Ia-M3.5Ib		

== See also ==
- Hayashi limit
- List of most massive stars
- M82 X-1
- M82 X-2
