= NGC 1358 =

Galaxy in the constellation Eridanus

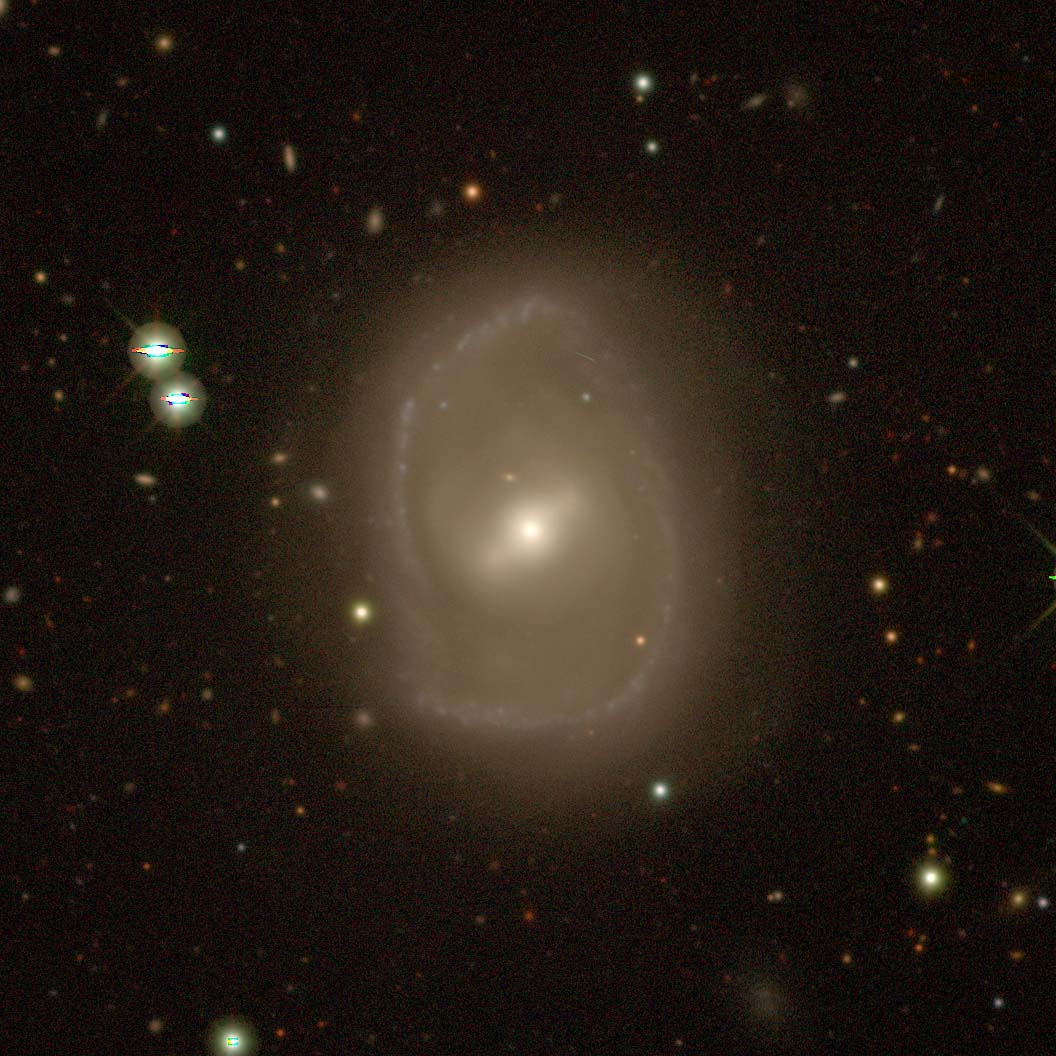
- Image of NGC 1358

Observation data (J2000 epoch)
- Constellation: Eridanus
- Right ascension: 03^{h} 33^{m} 39.7^{s}
- Declination: −05° 05′ 22″
- Redshift: 0.0134
- Heliocentric radial velocity: 4,002 km/s
- Distance: 190 Mly
- Apparent magnitude (V): 12.78
- Apparent magnitude (B): 13.20

Characteristics
- Type: SB0ar

Other designations
- LEDA 13182, 2MASX J03333970-0505224, IRAS F03311-0515

NGC 1358 is a barred lenticular galaxy with ring features located in the constellation Eridanus, approximately 190 million light-years (58.2 megaparsecs) from Earth. It is classified as a Seyfert 2 galaxy, characterized by its active galactic nucleus (AGN) powered by a supermassive black hole and exhibiting strong X-ray and infrared emissions. It was discovered by astronomer John Herschel on 1 December 1837 during his observations from the Cape of Good Hope.

== Characteristics ==
The galaxy is notable for its Compton-thick obscuration, where the central galactic core is heavily veiled by gas and dust with column densities exceeding 10^{24} atoms/cm². Multi-epoch monitoring with telescopes like NuSTAR and XMM-Newton has revealed variability in its X-ray absorption, linked to AGN feeding and feedback processes.

=== Environment ===
The galaxy is often imaged alongside NGC 1355.

== Research ==
Recent observations (as of 2024) using the Hubble Space Telescope (HST) have provided high-resolution O III and continuum images, enabling detailed studies of the narrow-line region (NLR) and its kinematics. Research published has explored the extents, geometries, and kinematics of the NLR in Seyfert galaxies like NGC 1358, identifying signatures of AGN-driven outflows. High ionization line images from the OASIS spectrograph and follow-up observations with Chandra and NuSTAR have further characterized the nuclear activity and obscuration. The galaxy's environment, including potential interactions with nearby galaxies like NGC 1355, has been studied to understand its evolutionary context. Analysis of its globular cluster system and outer ring structures suggests a complex formation history.
