= NGC 1376 =

Galaxy in the constellation Eridanus

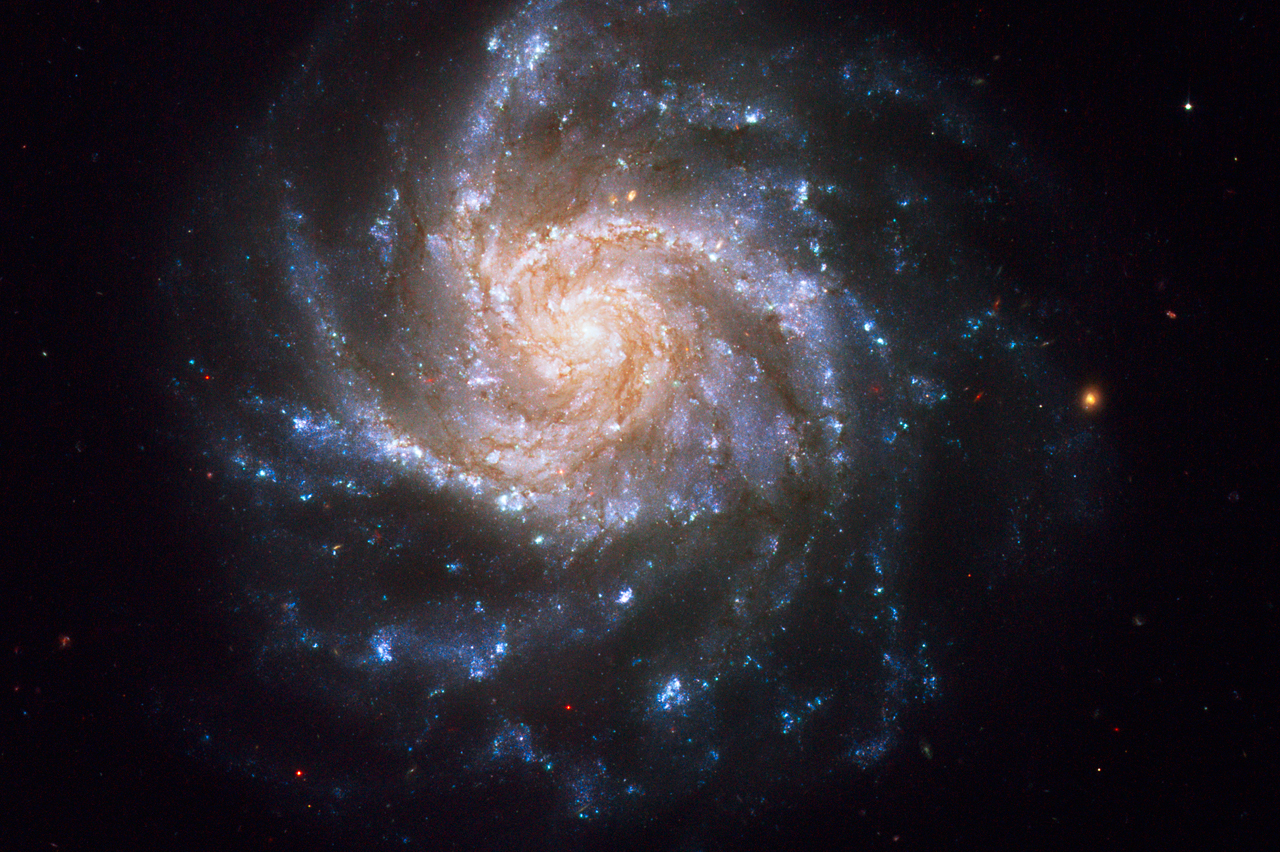
- A Hubble Space Telescope (HST) image of NGC 1376

Observation data (J2000 epoch)
- Constellation: Eridanus
- Right ascension: 03^{h} 37^{m} 05.80^{s}
- Declination: −05° 02′ 36″
- Redshift: 0.013873±0.00003
- Distance: 180 Mly (55.1 Mpc)
- Apparent magnitude (V): 12.1

Characteristics
- Type: SA(s)cd
- Size: 71,000 ly
- Apparent size (V): 1.95 x 1.82
- Notable features: Older stars near core

Other designations
- IRAS 03346-0512, MCG-01-10-011, PGC 13352, GSC 04722-00875

NGC 1376 is a spiral galaxy located around 180 million light-years away in the constellation Eridanus. It was discovered in 1785 by William Herschel, and it is 79,000 light-years across. NGC 1376 is not known to have an active galactic nuclei, but it does have lots of star-forming regions.

== Characteristics ==
Concentrated along the spiral arms of NGC 1376, bright blue knots of gas highlight areas of active star formation. These regions show an excess of light at ultraviolet (UV) wavelengths because they contain brilliant clusters of hot, newborn stars that are emitting UV light. The less intense, red areas near the core and between the arms consist mainly of older stars. The reddish dust lanes delineate cooler, denser regions where interstellar clouds collapse to form new stars. Behind the spiral arms is a sprinkling of reddish background galaxies.

NGC 1376 belongs to a class of spirals that are seen nearly face on from our line of sight. Its orientation aids astronomers in studying details and features of the galaxy from a relatively unobscured vantage point.

== Supernovae ==
Three supernovae have been observed in NGC 1376:

- SN 1999go (Type II, mag. 15.5) was discovered by the Lick Observatory Supernova Search (LOSS) on 23 December 1999. Its luminosity rivaled the brightness of the entire galactic nucleus (as seen from ground-based telescopes) for several weeks.
- SN 2003lo (Type IIn, mag. 17.2) was discovered by Tim Puckett and B. Kerns on 31 December 2003.
- SN 2011dx (Type Ia, mag. 16.5) was discovered by Berto Monard on 27 June 2011.
