= SS 433 =

Binary star system in the constellation Aquila

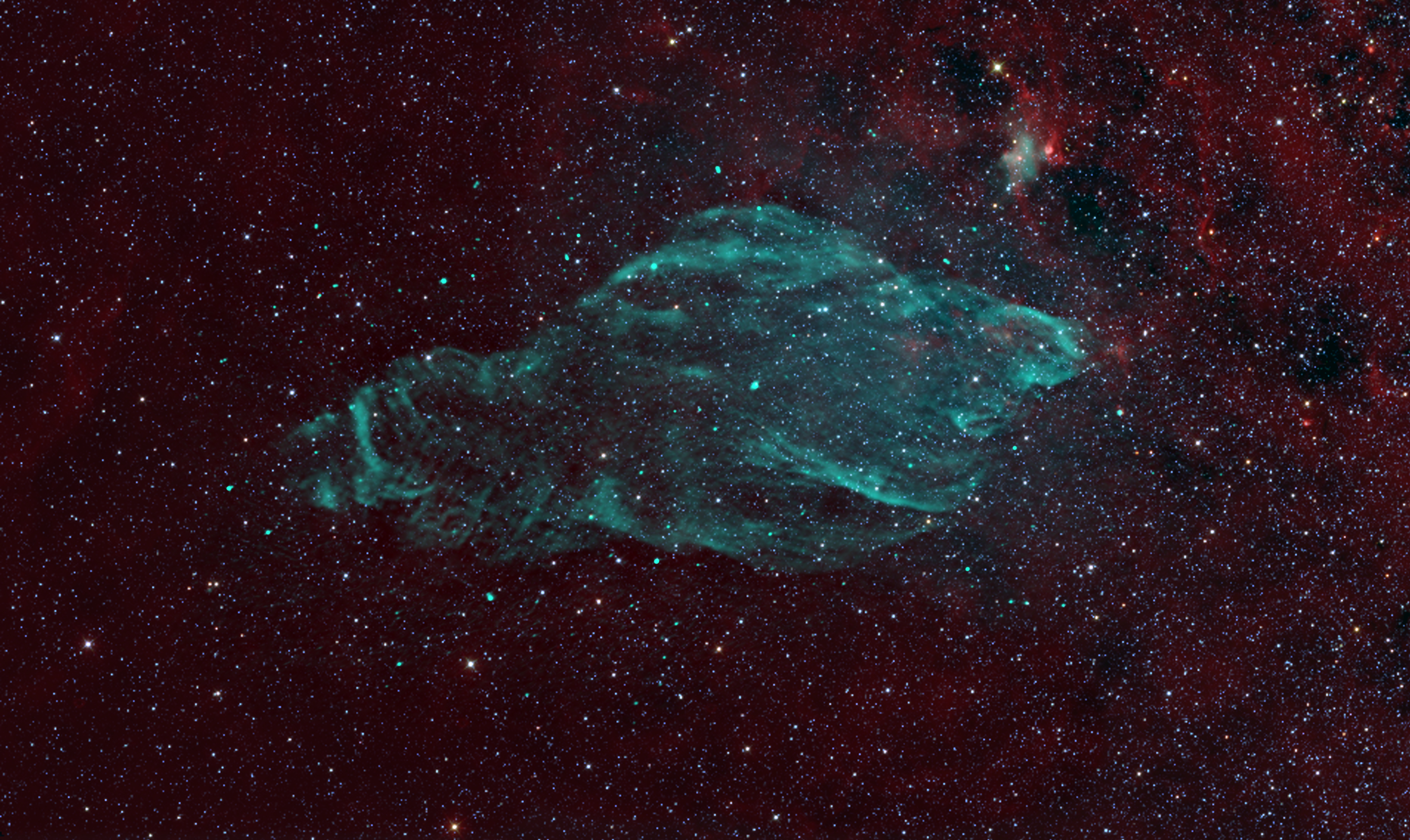
- SS 433 at the centre of supernova remnant W50; Credit: NRAO/AUI/NSF, K. Golap, M. Goss; NASA’s Wide Field Survey Explorer (WISE)

Observation data Epoch J2000.0 Equinox ICRS
- Constellation: Aquila
- Right ascension: 19^{h} 11^{m} 49.56^{s}
- Declination: +04° 58′ 57.8″
- Apparent magnitude (V): 13.0 - 17.3

Characteristics
- Spectral type: A7Ib
- Variable type: Eclipsing binary

Astrometry
Proper motion (μ)	RA: −3.027 mas/yr Dec.: −4.777 mas/yr
Parallax (π)	0.1182±0.0233 mas
Distance	18,000±700 ly (5,500±200 pc)

Orbit
Period (P)	13.082 d
Eccentricity (e)	0.05 ± 0.01
Inclination (i)	78.8°

Details

Donor star
Mass	10.9±3.1 M_{☉}
Radius	28±2 R_{☉}
Surface gravity (log g)	2.59±0.14 cgs
Temperature	8500±1000 K

Black hole
Mass	15 M_{☉}

Other designations
- V1343 Aql, GAL 039.7-02.0, 2MASS J19114957+0458578, USNO 659, 1A 1909+04, 87GB 190920.8+045332, NEK 40.1-02.1, 3A 1909+048, GPS 1909+049, RGB J1911+049, BWE 1909+0453, GRS 039.60 -01.80, RX J1911.7+0459, 4C 04.66, 1H 1908+047, 1RXS J191149.7+045857, 2E 1909.3+0453, HBHA 204-02, AAVSO 1906+04, 2E 4204, INTEGRAL1 110, TXS 1909+048, 1ES 1909+04.8, INTREF 969, 4U 1908+05.

Database references
SIMBAD	data

SS 433 is a microquasar or eclipsing X-ray binary system, consisting of a stellar-mass black hole accreting matter from an A-type companion star. SS 433 is the first discovered microquasar. It is at the centre of the supernova remnant W50.

SS 433's designation comes from the initials of two astronomers at Case Western Reserve University: Nicholas Sanduleak and Charles Bruce Stephenson. It was the 433rd entry in their 1977 catalog of stars with strong emission lines. Its emission lines were studied by Mordehai Milgrom in 1979.

== Location ==
SS 433, also known as V1343 Aquilae, is located in the galactic plane (l= 39.7° and b= -2.2°) at a distance of 18,000 light-years (5.5 kpc).

== System ==
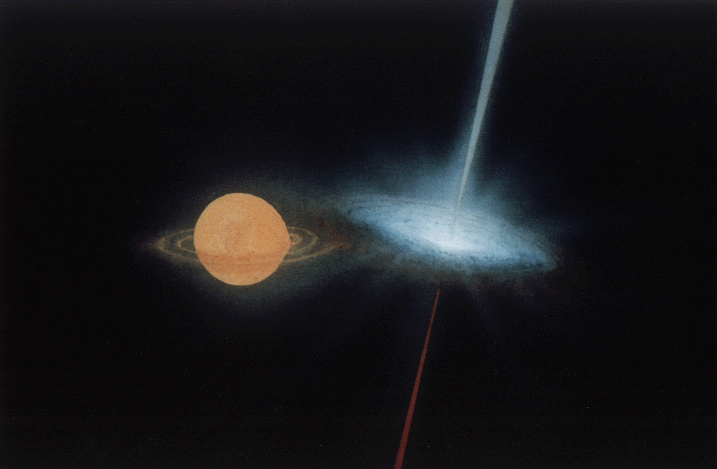
Artist's impression of SS 433

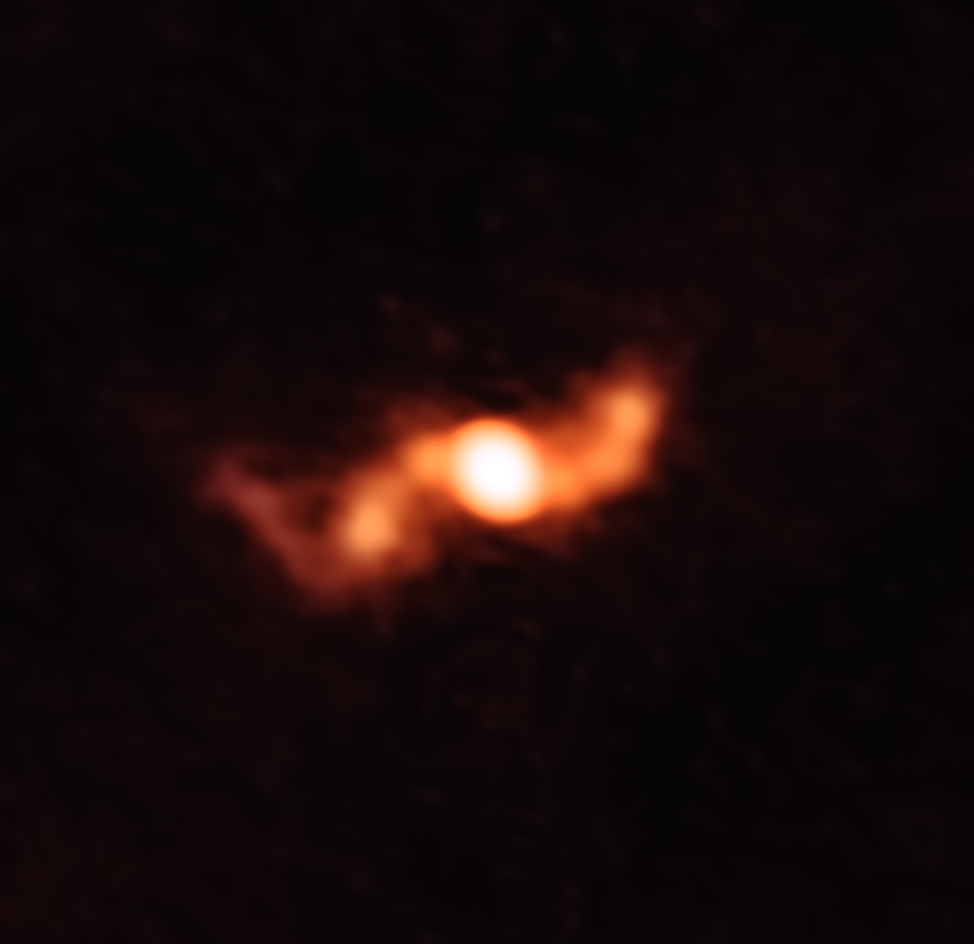
The jets of SS 433, captured by ALMA

The compact central object is consuming the companion star which rapidly loses mass into an accretion disc formed around the central object. The accretion disc is subject to extreme heating as it spirals into the primary and this heating causes the accretion disc to give off intense X-rays and opposing jets of hot hydrogen along the axis of rotation, above and below the plane of the accretion disc. The material in the jets travels at 26% of the speed of light. The companion star presumably had lower mass than the original primary object and was therefore longer lived. Estimates for its mass range from 3 to 30 solar masses. The primary and secondary orbit each other at a very close distance in stellar terms, with an orbital period of 13.082 days. Their orbit is very slightly eccentric, and its period is slowly increasing at a rate of about 3 seconds per year.

== Observational data ==
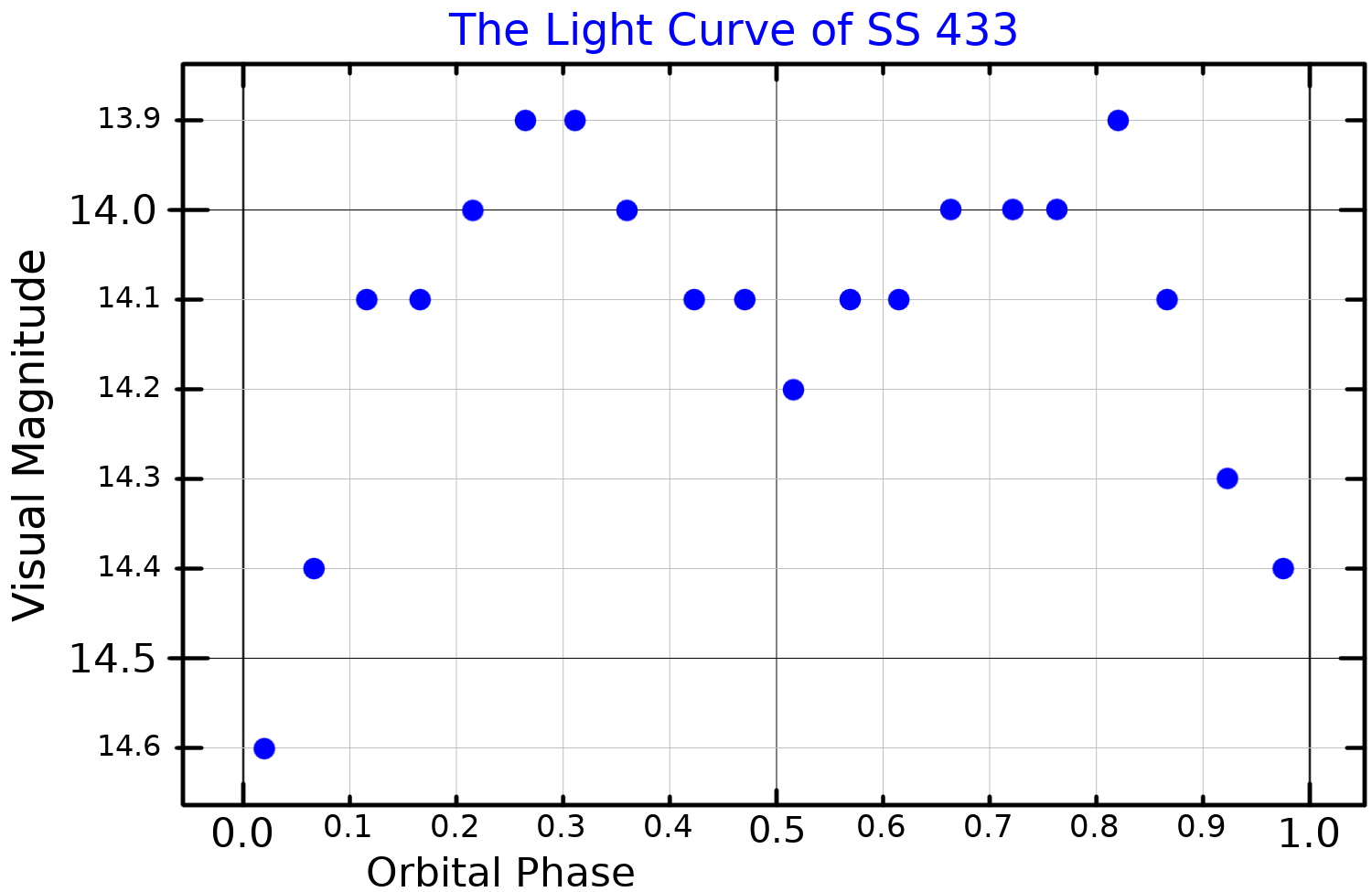
A visual band light curve for SS 433, adapted from Watarai & Fukue (2010)

The jets from the primary are emitted perpendicular to its accretion disk. The jets and disk precess around an axis inclined about 79° to a line between Earth and SS 433. The angle between the jets and the axis is around 20°, and the precessional period is around 162.5 days. Precession means that the jets sometimes point more towards the Earth, and sometimes more away, producing both blue and red Doppler shifts in the observed visible spectrum. Also, the precession means that the jets corkscrew through space in an expanding helical spray. As they impact the surrounding W50 supernova remnant clouds, they distort it into an elongated shape.

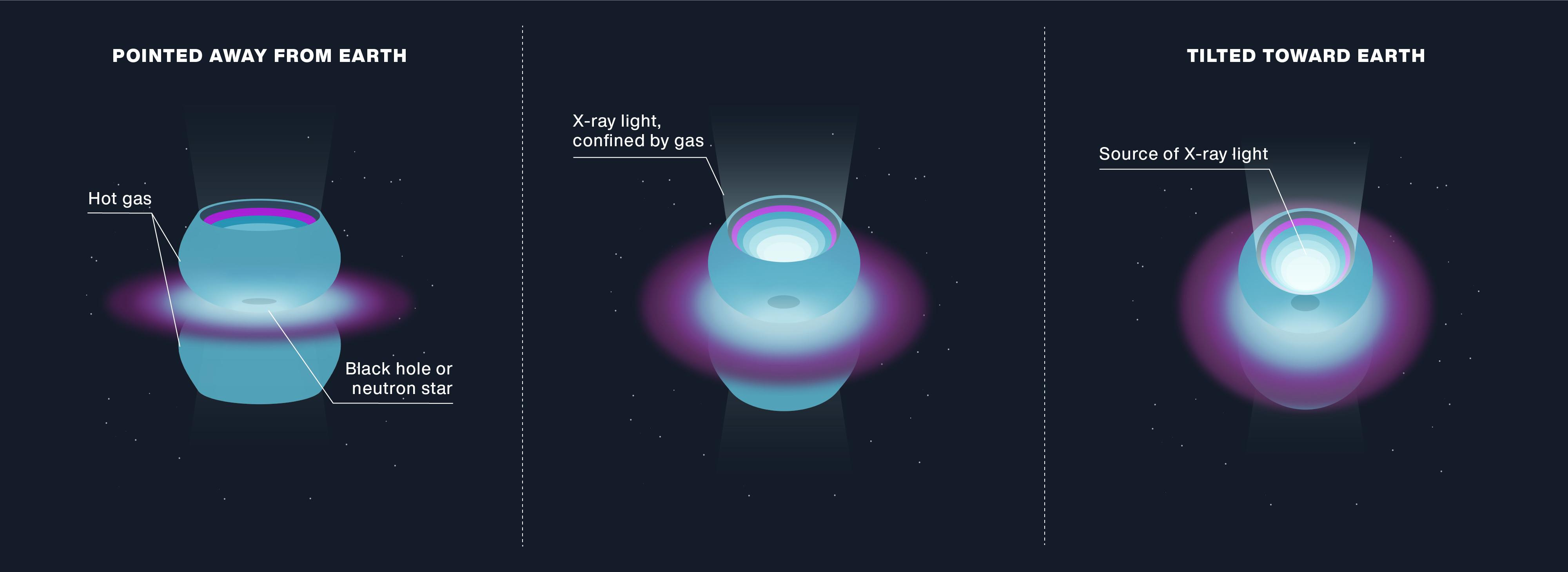
SS 433 - possible ULX ray source

Observations in 2004 by the Very Long Baseline Array for 42 consecutive days gave new data and understanding of the action of the jets. It appears that the jets are sometimes impacting material shortly after being created and thus brightening. The material the jets are impacting appears to be replaced some of the time, but not always, leading to variations in the brightening of the jets.

The spectrum of SS 433 is affected not just by Doppler shifts but also by relativity: when the effects of the Doppler shift are subtracted, there is a residual redshift which corresponds to a velocity of about 12,000 kilometers per second. This does not represent an actual velocity of the system away from the Earth; rather, it is due to time dilation, which makes moving clocks appear to stationary observers to be ticking more slowly. In this case, the relativistically moving excited atoms in the jets appear to vibrate more slowly and their radiation thus appears red-shifted.

In September 2018, A. U. Abeysekara et al. published in Nature details of investigations using the High-Altitude Water Cherenkov Gamma-Ray (HAWC) Observatory in Mexico. They reported teraelectronvolt γ-ray observations exceeding 25TeV of the SS 433/W50 system that spatially resolve the lobes, and consistent with a single population of electrons with energies extending to at least hundreds of teraelectronvolts in a magnetic field of about 16 microgauss.

== See also ==
- High-mass X-ray binary
- Ultraluminous X-ray source
