= Depth-graded multilayer coating =

A depth-graded multilayer coating is a multi-layer coating optimised for broadband response by varying the thickness of the layers used.

A multi-layer coating consisting of alternating layers with different optical properties and the same thickness will tend to have a narrow frequency response, getting narrower as more layers are added; for some applications such as precise focussing of a monochromatic laser light source this is exactly what's desired, but it is useless for astronomical optics where it is often required to detect a whole range of frequencies emitted by some source of interest.

The design of such coatings generally starts with an approximate analytical solution and then uses the simplex method of multi-variable optimisation to solve for optimal thicknesses of the layers. Typically the thin layers (to reflect high-energy X-rays) are on the inside since low-energy X-rays are absorbed more readily. One model used is a power law distribution of thicknesses, with the thickness of the ith bilayer as a/(b+i)^c for some optimised a, b, c.

An optimum multilayer design depends on the graze angle, so ideally a different prescription would be used on each shell of a multi-shell X-ray Wolter mirror; in practice the same prescription is used for about ten shells.

Characterising such coatings requires a synchrotron as a variable-wavelength X-ray source.

The Danish Space Research Institute in Copenhagen is (in 2012) the world centre of excellence for such coatings, though a good deal of the earlier research and development was done in Russia.
