= Westerhout 50 =

Supernova remnant nebula in the constellation Aquila

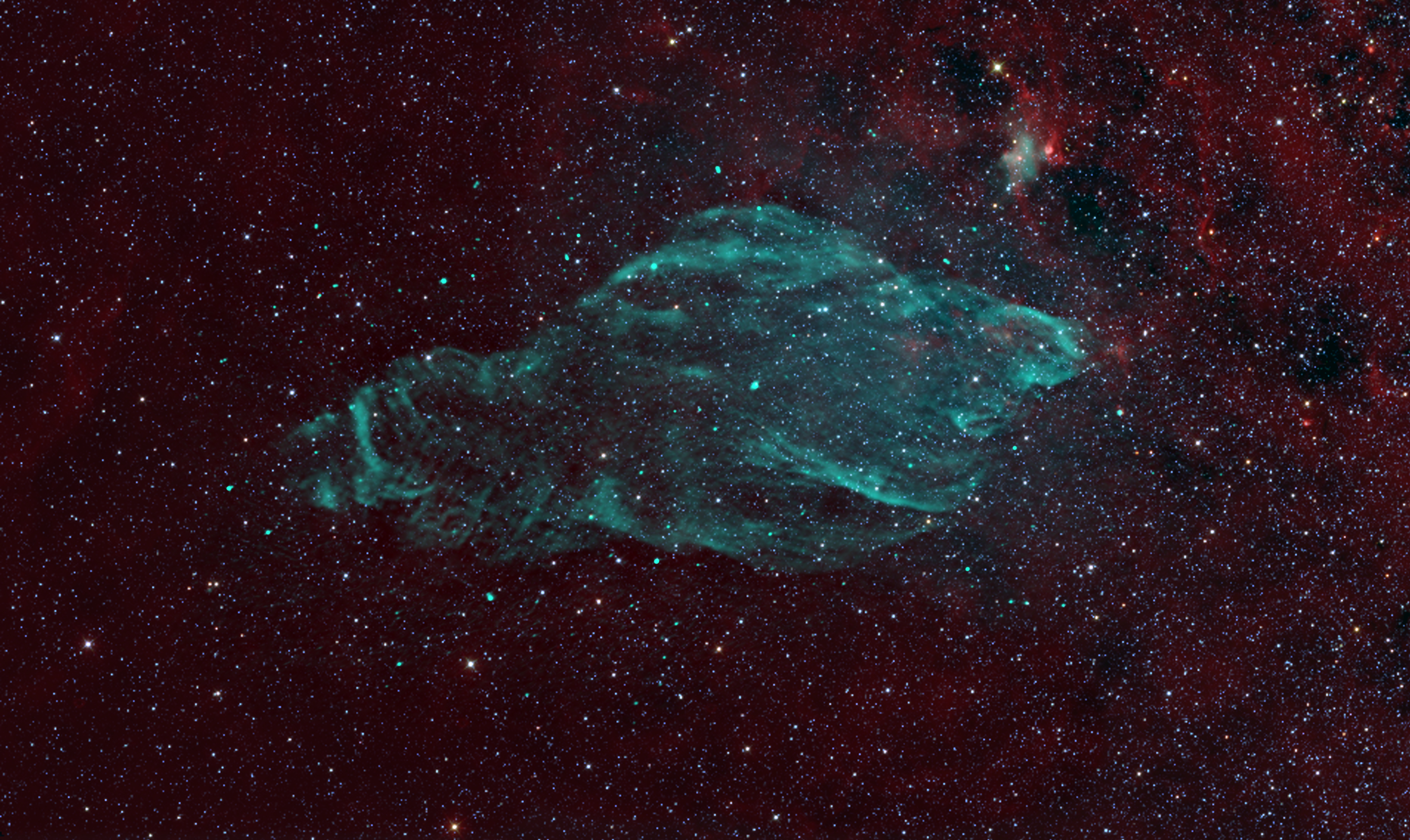
- Westerhout 50
- Event type: Supernova remnant
- II
- Constellation: Aquila
- Right ascension: 19^{h} 11^{m} 49^{s}
- Declination: +04° 59′ 12′′
- Epoch: J2000.0
- Galactic coordinates: 039.697 -02.241
- Distance: 18,000 Ly
- Remnant: ?
- Notable features: central source: SS 433.
- Peak apparent magnitude: ?
- Other designations: SNR G039.7-02.0, AJG 93, CTB 69, LMH 40, [DGW65] 121
- Related media on Commons

Westerhout 50 (W50) or SNR G039.7-02.0, also referred to as the Manatee Nebula, is a supernova remnant located in the constellation Aquila, about 18,000 light years away. In its centre lies the micro-quasar SS 433, whose jets are distorting the remnant's shell. Most likely W50 and SS 433 are related objects, remnants from a supernova which occurred about 20,000 years ago.

== Book sources ==
- Tills, Tony (2013), Science Year, World Book, Inc., ISBN 9780716605676
