= Ultraluminous X-ray source =

Type of x-ray source

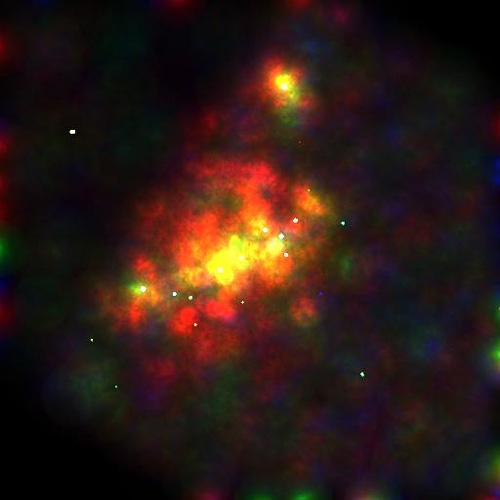
A Chandra image of NGC 4485 and NGC 4490: two potential ULXs

In astronomy and astrophysics, an ultraluminous X-ray source (ULX) is less luminous than an active galactic nucleus but more consistently luminous than any known stellar process (over 10^{39} erg/s, or 10^{32} watts), assuming that it radiates isotropically (the same in all directions). Typically there is about one ULX per galaxy in galaxies which host them, but some galaxies contain many. The Milky Way has not been shown to contain an ULX, although SS 433 is a candidate. The main interest in ULXs stems from their luminosity exceeding the Eddington luminosity of neutron stars and even stellar black holes. It is not known what powers ULXs; models include beamed emission of stellar mass objects, accreting intermediate-mass black holes, and super-Eddington emission.

== Observational facts ==
ULXs were first discovered in the 1980s by the Einstein Observatory. Later observations were made by ROSAT. Great progress has been made by the X-ray observatories XMM-Newton and Chandra, which have a much greater spectral and angular resolution. A survey of ULXs by Chandra observations shows that there is approximately one ULX per galaxy in galaxies which host ULXs (most do not). ULXs are found in all types of galaxies, including elliptical galaxies but are more ubiquitous in star-forming galaxies and in gravitationally interacting galaxies. Tens of percents of ULXs are in fact background quasars; the probability for a ULX to be a background source is larger in elliptical galaxies than in spiral galaxies.

== Models ==
The fact that ULXs have Eddington luminosities larger than that of stellar mass objects implies that they are different from normal X-ray binaries. There are several models for ULXs, and it is likely that different models apply for different sources.

Beamed emission — If the emission of the sources is strongly beamed, the Eddington argument is circumvented twice: first because the actual luminosity of the source is lower than inferred, and second because the accreted gas may come from a different direction than that in which the photons are emitted. Modelling indicates that stellar mass sources may reach luminosities up to 10^{40} erg/s (10^{33} W), enough to explain most of the sources, but too low for the most luminous sources. If the source is stellar mass and has a thermal spectrum, its temperature should be high, temperature times the Boltzmann constant kT ≈ 1 keV, and quasi-periodic oscillations are not expected.

Intermediate-mass black holes — Black holes are observed in nature with masses of the order of ten times the mass of the Sun, and with masses of millions to billions times the solar mass. The former are 'stellar black holes', the end product of massive stars, while the latter are supermassive black holes, and exist in the centers of galaxies. Intermediate-mass black holes (IMBHs) are a hypothetical third class of objects, with masses in the range of hundreds to thousands of solar masses. Intermediate-mass black holes are light enough not to sink to the center of their host galaxies by dynamical friction, but sufficiently massive to be able to emit at ULX luminosities without exceeding the Eddington limit. If a ULX is an intermediate-mass black hole, in the high/soft state it should have a thermal component from an accretion disk peaking at a relatively low temperature (kT ≈ 0.1 keV) and it may exhibit quasi-periodic oscillation at relatively low frequencies.

An argument made in favor of some sources as possible IMBHs is the analogy of the X-ray spectra as scaled-up stellar mass black hole X-ray binaries. The spectra of X-ray binaries have been observed to go through various transition states. The most notable of these states are the low/hard state and the high/soft state (see Remillard & McClintock 2006). The low/hard state or power-law dominated state is characterized by an absorbed power-law X-ray spectrum with spectral index from 1.5 to 2.0 (hard X-ray spectrum). Historically, this state was associated with a lower luminosity, though with better observations with satellites such as RXTE, this is not necessarily the case. The high/soft state is characterized by an absorbed thermal component (blackbody with a disk temperature of (kT ≈ 1.0 keV) and power-law (spectral index ≈ 2.5). At least one ULX source, Holmberg II X-1, has been observed in states with spectra characteristic of both the high and low state. This suggests that some ULXs may be accreting IMBHs (see Winter, Mushotzky, Reynolds 2006).

Background quasars — A significant fraction of observed ULXs are in fact background sources. Such sources may be identified by a very low temperature (e.g. the soft excess in PG quasars).

Supernova remnants — Bright supernova (SN) remnants may perhaps reach luminosities as high as 10^{39} erg/s (10^{32} W). If a ULX is a SN remnant it is not variable on short time-scales, and fades on a time-scale of the order of a few years.

== Notable ULXs ==
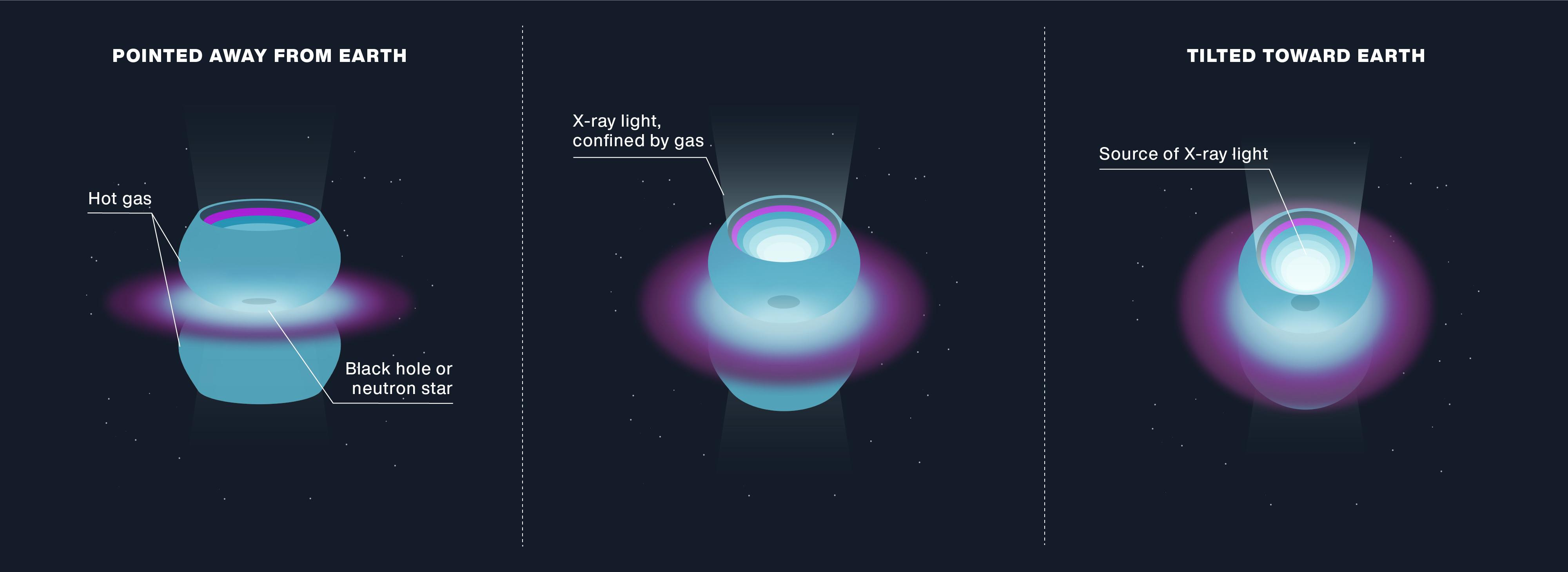
SS 433 - possible ULX ray object

- Holmberg II X-1: This famous ULX resides in a dwarf galaxy. Multiple observations with XMM have revealed the source in both a low/hard and high/soft state, suggesting that this source could be a scaled-up X-ray binary or accreting IMBH.
- M74: Possibly containing an intermediate-mass black hole, as observed by Chandra in 2005.
- M82 X-1: This is the most luminous known ULX (as of Oct 2004), and has often been marked as the best candidate to host an intermediate-mass black hole. M82-X1 is associated with a star cluster, exhibits quasi-periodic oscillations (QPOs), has a modulation of 62 days in its X-ray amplitude.
- M82 X-2: An unusual ULX that was discovered in 2014 to be a pulsar rather than a black hole.
- M101-X1: One of the brightest ULXs, with luminosities up to 10^{41} erg/s (10^{34} W). This ULX coincides with an optical source that has been interpreted to be a supergiant star, thus supporting the case that this may be an X-ray binary.
- NGC 5907 ULX-1: Another one of the brightest ULXs, with luminosity exceeding 10^{41} erg/s, a factor of ~500 above its Eddington luminosity. It is believed to be a high-mass X-ray binary with high variability and a regular period of about 5.7 days.
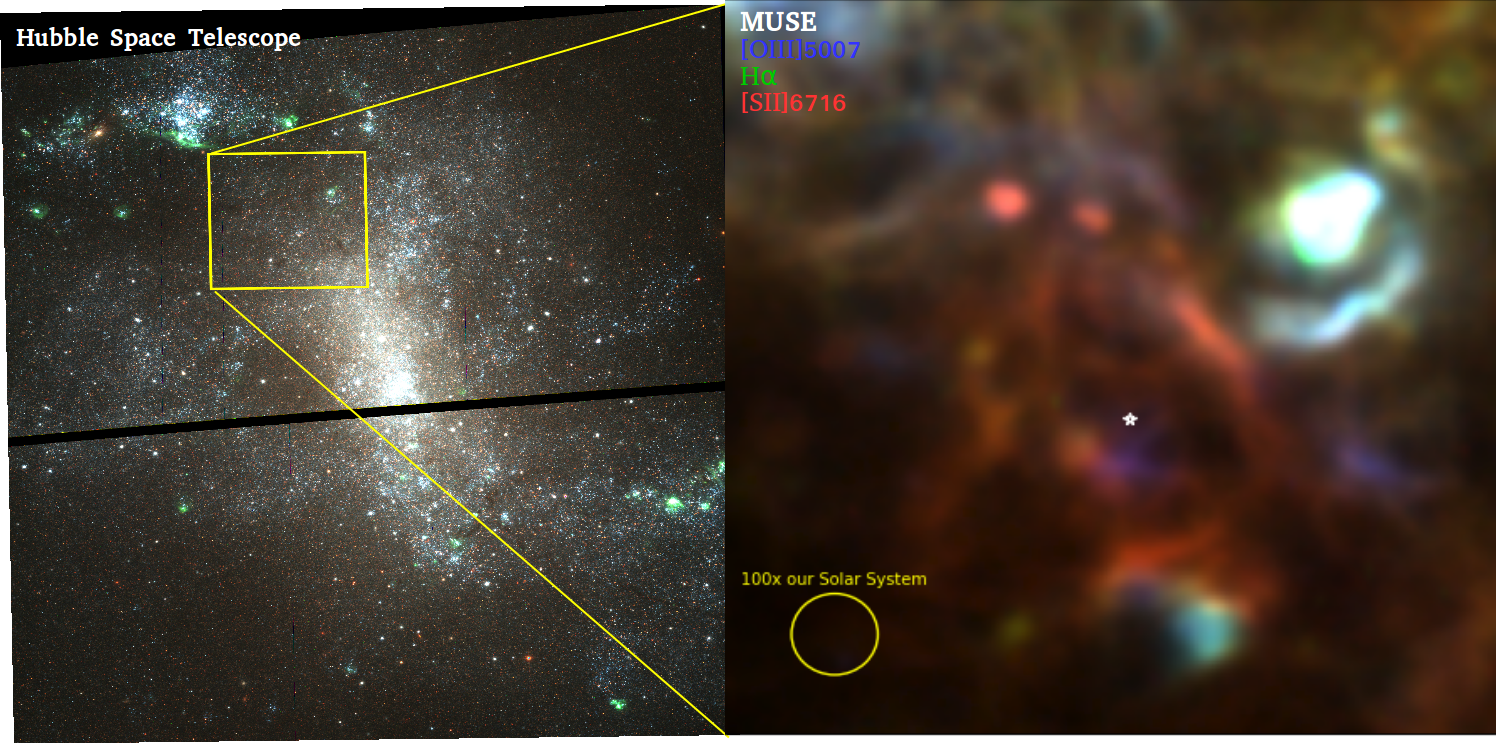
- Side-by-side Hubble and Very Large Telescope MUSE images of the environment around NGC 1313 X-1. The MUSE RGB image of the nebula carved by the ULX sitting at its center (indicated by a star) is seen in three narrow filters showing oxygen, sulfur and hydrogen emission.
  NGC 1313 X1 and X2: NGC 1313, a spiral galaxy in the constellation Reticulum, contains two ultraluminous X-ray sources. These two sources had low temperature disk components, which was interpreted as possible evidence for the presence of an intermediate-mass black hole. However, while the low-energy emission can be modelled as a low-temperature disk, the high-energy emission is at odds with the intermediate-mass black hole hypothesis. Moreover, X-ray pulsations have been detected in NGC 1313 X-2, identifying the object as a neutron star. At the same time, the intermediate-mass black hole hypothesis cannot account for the presence of large optical bubbles surrounding each of the ULXs. It is more likely that these two ULXs host stellar-mass neutron stars or black holes accreting at super-Eddington mass-transfer rates and that the powerful winds from the accretion disk have blown away the cavity that surrounds them.
- RX J0209.6-7427: A transient Be X-ray binary system last detected in 1993 in the Magellanic bridge that was found to be an ULX pulsar when it woke up from deep slumber after 26 years in 2019.

== See also ==
- Astronomical X-ray source
- X-ray astronomy
