= Ultracompact X-ray binary =

Type of low-mass X-ray binary

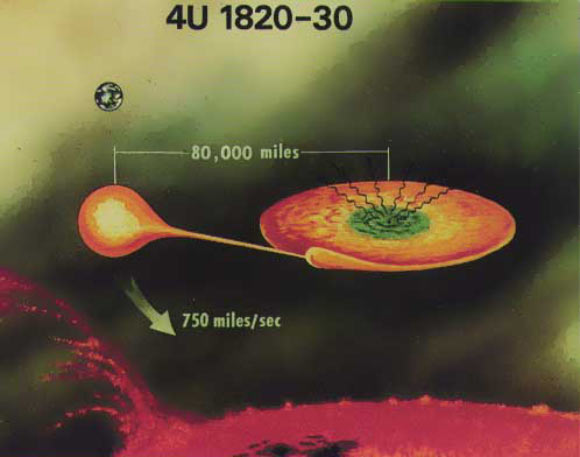
Artist's impression of 4U 1820–30, the shortest-period UCXB known, with Earth for scale

An ultracompact X-ray binary (UCXB) is a type of low-mass X-ray binary with an orbital period of less than ~60–80 minutes. These binaries contain an accreting compact object (black hole or neutron star) and a white dwarf or helium-burning subgiant star, the only star types possible to have an orbit this short. These binaries can be found in both globular clusters and the galactic field and can be formed either through stellar evolution or dynamical interactions between stars, and they can often be observed accreting persistently at low luminosities. UCXBs are uniquely hydrogen-deficient due to both stars being evolved, and their chemical composition, gravitational-wave emission, and the presence of one or more compact objects makes them objects of interest to astronomers.

== Formation ==
UCXBs can be found in both the galactic field and in globular clusters. For field UCXBs, there are three main mechanisms of formation. The first route is when a white dwarf and a neutron star or black hole are in a binary. Due to angular momentum loss or gravitational radiation (gravitational wave emission), the objects will get close enough for mass transfer to occur. This white dwarf must be relatively small–less than ~0.83 M_{☉}—or mass transfer will be dynamically unstable and the binary system will not survive. In the second case, a semi-degenerate helium star fills its Roche lobe and begins transferring mass to its compact companion. Thirdly, a star at the end of the main sequence fills its Roche lobe and begins mass transfer; such a star will have a helium-rich core but will not be as evolved as in the second case.

For UCXBs in globular clusters, dynamical interactions between multiple stars and star systems are expected to result in UCXBs. These interactions occur when a compact object tidally captures a passing star, or when the compact object encounters a binary star system and swaps places with one of the binary stars. However, these mechanisms are not able to explain UCXBs with the shortest orbital periods.

== Properties ==
UCXBs are chemically-peculiar stars, with very low concentrations of hydrogen and high concentrations of helium, carbon, oxygen, and neon. This is because both objects in the system are evolved and have thus fused most of their hydrogen. In systems with white dwarf donors, the system will be mainly composed of helium, carbon, nitrogen, and oxygen (the latter 3 of which have been created by the CNO cycle). In systems where the donor star is at the end of the main-sequence, the chemical composition will be similar, but with more hydrogen. When the donor is a helium star, the system will mostly be made up of helium and the products of helium fusion.

Because of the nature of the components in UCXBs, emission and absorption lines are relatively scant. This can make the chemical composition and orbital dynamics of these systems difficult to discern, making it hard to observationally confirm a UCXB. When UCXB spectra are visible, they may contain spectral signatures of carbon and oxygen, and will not show the strong hydrogen emission lines characteristic of typical LMXBs.

UCXBs are analogous to AM Canum Venaticorum (AM CVn) stars, a type of cataclysmic variable star with a similarly-short orbital period but containing a white dwarf as the accretor instead of a neutron star. However, UCXBs are much rarer than AM CVn stars, and those that have been observed are further away than most AM CVn stars, making the properties of UCXBs more difficult to discern.

== Dynamics ==
Chandra image of persistent UCXB M15 X-2 (right), alongside another X-ray binary.

Most UCXBs are persistently bright in X-rays, although a minority are transient and experience phases of quiescence. This suggests that UCXBs are accreting consistently. Although theoretical models show that UCXBs with periods longer than ~30 minutes should be transients as long as their rate of accretion is consistent long-term, several persistent UCXBs with longer orbital periods have been discovered.

UCXBs generally have low luminosities compared to other types of X-ray binaries. This is because their accretion disks must be relatively small in order for them to have such short orbital periods, and the size of an accretion disk is correlated with its luminosity.

== Evolution ==
When a UCXB forms with a relatively-massive donor (~1 M_{☉}), mass transfer is initially very rapid, above the Eddington limit. Most of this matter is ejected from the system via isotropic re-emission. At the same time, the period of the system increases quickly. Eventually, the rate of both mass transfer and orbital period increase taper off. By the time the accretion rate reaches sub-Eddington levels, the mass of the donor star is only ~0.08 M_{☉}. Systems with more massive accretors go through this evolution more quickly.

The components of UCXBs may eventually merge, releasing gravitational waves.

== Observation ==
Artist's impression of black hole UCXB candidate Tucanae X9

Identifying an LMXB as a UCXB requires measurement of orbital period. This is primarily done either through observation of orbital modulation or through the timing of an accreting millisecond X-ray pulsar (AMXP) in the system.

Gravitational waves from UCXBs may be observed by future gravitational-wave observatories such as the Laser Interferometer Space Antenna (LISA) and TianQin. These gravitational waves would be detectable as the stars orbited each other as dual-line sources and upon their coalescence as chirp sources. UCXBs are also useful for observation because they allow scientists to test and expand theories of the evolution of binary stars, particularly the common envelope phase of binary evolution.

As of September 2026, there are 20 confirmed UCXBs, 8 of which are in globular clusters, and 28 more candidate UCXBs, 3 of which are in globular clusters. Of the 48 total potential UCXBs, 28 are persistent, with the other 20 being transients, and 43 are confirmed to contain a neutron star accretor, of which 10 are accreting millisecond X-ray pulsars (AMXPs). So far, no black hole UCXBs have been confirmed, although candidates have been discovered. This may be due to observation bias, as black hole UXCBs would have low radiative efficiency and duration of outbursts, and measuring the orbital period of a black hole UCXB would be difficult.

== Notable UCXBs ==
- 47 Tucanae X9, a black hole UCXB candidate
- M31 UCXB-1, the first-known extragalactic UCXB and a black hole-white dwarf binary candidate
- 4U 1823–30, the UCXB with the shortest known period at 11 minutes
- 4U 0614+091, the closest-known confirmed UCXB at a distance of ~2 kiloparsec
