= Accreting millisecond X-ray pulsar =

Type of low-mass X-ray binary

Artist's impression of Swift J1749.4–2807, the first-known eclipsing AMXP

An accreting millisecond X-ray pulsar (AMXP, AMSP, or AMP) is a type of low-mass X-ray binary (LMXB) star system containing a pulsar with a short spin period accreting matter off of a companion star and emitting X-rays. The companion can either be a white dwarf, a brown dwarf, or a main-sequence star. Unlike other types of LMXBs, AMXPs display coherent pulsations at a consistent frequency, and they provided the first direct evidence of the pulsar recycling theory. AMXPs are transient systems that evolve from main-sequence or subgiant binaries and may eventually become spider pulsars or millisecond radio pulsars.

== Formation ==
AMXPs evolve from LMXBs, but several methods of formation are possible. If the binary system has an initial period of ~0.5 days, the companion star will begin mass transfer while it is relatively unevolved. The system will evolve similarly to a cataclysmic variable, with the companion star transferring mass until it is fully convective, upon which mass transfer ceases and the system becomes detached. Eventually, the binary's orbital period will decrease due to gravitational wave emission, and the companion star will once again fill its Roche lobe and restart mass transfer. At this point, an AMXP has been created with a 1–3 hour orbital period, and the companion star will have lost enough mass to become a hydrogen-rich brown dwarf of ~0.01 solar masses (M_{☉}).

If the initial orbital period is ~2.5 days, the companion star has exhausted nearly all of the hydrogen in its center by the time mass transfer begins, with the star filling its Roche lobe due to angular momentum loss from magnetic braking. For the first ~100 million years after the onset of mass transfer, the rate of mass transfer will increase quickly, before steadily declining for the next ~3 billion years. At this point, the binary will have a short enough period to become an ultracompact X-ray binary (UCXB) and the mass transfer rate will increase up until the binary reaches a minimum orbital period of about 10 minutes, after which the orbital period will start to increase while the mass transfer rate decreases again. Eventually, the mass transfer rate will be low enough for the system to become a transient source and an AMXP. By this point, the companion star will be a white or brown dwarf.

If the initial orbital period is ~2.8 days, the companion star will fill its Roche lobe and begin mass transfer during the subgiant stage. Over time, the orbital period will increase, and the system will likely be transient and will become an AMXP. Eventually, the two stars will get far enough away from each other that mass transfer will cease and the system will become detached again; by this point, the companion star will be a He/CO white dwarf with a mass ~0.006 M_{☉}. It is also possible for the reverse effect to occur: an LMXB may also evolve from a neutron star/main-sequence star binary, which then evolves into a detached millisecond pulsar/He white dwarf binary, before eventually becoming a UCXB and AMXP after the He white dwarf fills its Roche lobe.

== Properties ==
IGR J17062–6143, the shortest-period AMXP known with an orbital period of 38 minutes, accretes matter from a very-low-mass white dwarf companion

AMXPs are accretion-powered X-ray pulsars rotating at frequencies greater than or equal to 50 Hz (equivalent to spin periods of less than 20 milliseconds) and which have weak magnetic fields of 10^{8}–10^{9} G. As LMXBs, they by definition contain a companion star of less than 1 M_{☉}, although the companion tends to be much less massive, usually below 0.2 M_{☉}.

A large proportion of AMXPs—roughly 40%—are also ultracompact X-ray binaries (UCXBs). UCXBs are LMXBs with an orbital period of less than ~80 minutes. Shorter orbital periods are associated with smaller donor stars—the shortest-period AMXPs, with periods less than 1 hour, all have white dwarf companions; AMXPs with 1–3 hour periods have brown dwarf companions; and AMXPs with longer periods have main-sequence companions.

AMXPs show similar spectra to neutron star LMXBs in the hard X-ray spectral state. Their spectra consist of 1–2 blackbody components from the accretion disk and a Comptonization component from the disk corona. In many, but not all, AMXPs, relativistic reflection features can be detected due to reflection of photons from the corona off of the much-colder accretion disk.

== Dynamics ==
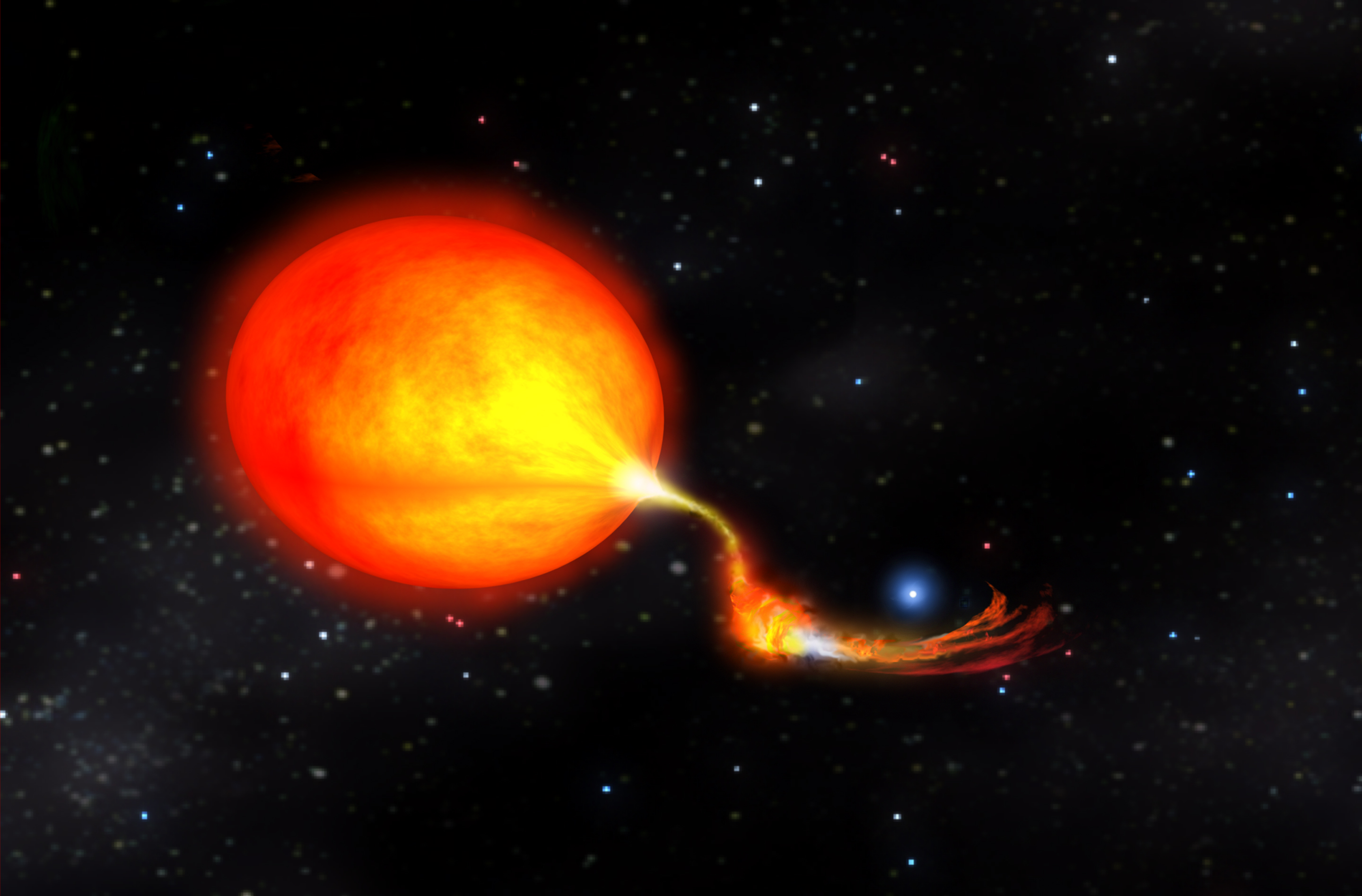
Artist's impression of spin-up

The companion star transfer mass to the neutron star via Roche lobe overflow, and the orbital periods of these systems are less than 1 day long. All known AMXPs are transient systems, experiencing periods of active accretion (outbursts) and quiescence. Outbursts can last from days to years and recur over periods of a month or more. During the outburst phase, their luminosities are relatively low—usually below 10% of the Eddington luminosity—suggesting a low mass accretion rate, and X-ray pulsations occur. In some AMXPs, these pulsations may only appear sporadically, possibly due to a higher-than-average (for an AMXP) mass accretion rate. The spectra of AMXPs do not transition from the hard X-ray state and the soft X-ray state and spend all their time in the hard state, leading them to sometimes be referred to as hard X-ray transients.

Rotational periods of the neutron stars in AMXPs can change both over the short term and the long term. During accretion phases, some AMXPs have been observed to spin up (i.e., their rotational frequency increased) while others have been seen spinning down. The AMXP SAX J1808.4–3658 has been observed to spin up at the beginning of an outburst and spin down near the end of one. Several AMXPs have also spun down over long periods of time between outbursts.

AMXPs can also vary in the orbital period of the two stars. Several AMXPs have been observed to have a (relatively) rapidly increasing orbital period, on the order of 10^{12} s s^{-1}, (Note: This is equivalent to an increase of ~10^{−4} seconds per year, or an increase in orbital period by 1 second every ~10,000 years) due to—at least in part—non-conservative mass transfer. Some AMXPs also experience periodic oscillations in their orbital periods, which can happen concurrently with an overall long-term orbital period increase; when they co-occur, it is known as the Applegate & Shaman mechanism.

== Evolution ==
It is possible that AMXPs are an intermediate stage between LMXBs and spider pulsars. Black widow pulsars and AMXPs have similar donor masses, but black widows have a slightly longer orbital period, likely due to irradiation of the companion by the neutron star. They may also evolve into millisecond radio pulsars, although some sources dispute this due to the large difference in orbital periods between the two classes. Four transitional millisecond pulsars have been observed to switch between an AMXP state and a millisecond radio pulsar state over short time periods. Regardless of the final evolutionary stage of AMXPs, they cannot persist forever, as Roche lobe overflow will eventually cease, leaving the binary system detached and non-accreting.

== Observation ==
Light curve for SAX J1808.4–3658

The first known AMXP, SAX J1808.4–3658, was identified in 1998 with the Rossi X-ray Timing Explorer (RXTE). This observatory has discovered many AMXPs, although other X-ray and gamma-ray observatories, including XMM-Newton, INTEGRAL, Chandra, Swift, HETE, NICER, and NuSTAR, have also played a role in identifying and characterizing these sources. AMXPs are relatively rare—As of April 2026, 23 total AMXPs have been discovered, with a discovery happening roughly once per year. These AMXPs have rotational frequencies of 105–599 Hz (equivalent to spin periods of ~1.67–9.52 ms).

The discovery of AMXPs provided the first direct evidence of the pulsar recycling scenario. Non-accreting pulsars with very fast rotation rates and weak magnetic fields, known as millisecond pulsars (MSPs), had been previously discovered. Because it takes time for a neutron star to lose its very strong magnetic field after it first forms, these MSPs had to have formed a long time ago. Thus, it was suggested that the MSPs had been spun-up to such high rates of spin by accretion of matter as LMXBs, and had now become detached and were no longer accreting. However, until 1998, no coherent pulsations were found in LMXBs to indicate they were spinning fast. AMXPs were the "missing link"—observations of fast, coherent pulsations from accreting neutron stars proved that LMXBs could host a rapidly-rotating neutron star.

AMXPs have properties very similar to that of non-pulsating neutron star LMXBs, particularly regarding spectra, aperiodic and quasi-periodic variability, and the presence of type I X-ray bursts. In particular, with the exception of their pulsations, AMXPs behave very similarly to transient atoll sources. However, the vast majority of neutron star LMXBs do not show pulsations. Although theories have been proposed as to why most LMXBs lack coherent pulsations, such as "smearing" of pulsations due to relativistic reflection, alignment of the neutron star's magnetic and rotational axes, and magnetohydrodynamic instabilities between the disk and the magnetosphere, no solution that explains all of the missing pulsars has been found.

== Properties of known AMXPs ==
Name	Discovery	Rotational frequency (Hz)	Orbital period (h)	Companion mass (M_{☉})	Companion type	References
SAX J1808.4–3658	September 1996 (BeppoSAX) (Note: This source was discovered in 1996, but was not identified as an AMXP until 1998 using RXTE.)	401	2.01	0.07–0.11	Brown dwarf	
SAX J1748.9–2021	August 1998 (BeppoSAX/WFC)	442	8.77	>0.1	Main-sequence star	
XTE J1751–305	April 2002 (RXTE)	435	0.7	0.013–0.017	He or C/O white dwarf	
XTE J0929–314	April 2002 (RXTE/ASM)	185	0.727	~0.01	He white dwarf	
XTE J1807–294	February 2003 (RXTE)	190	0.668	0.0066–0.022	C/O white dwarf	
XTE J1814–338	June 2003 (RXTE/PCA)	314	4.27	>0.17	Main-sequence star	
IGR J00291+5934	December 2004 (INTEGRAL)	599	2.46	>0.039	Brown dwarf	
HETE J1900.1–2455	June 2005 (HETE)	377	1.4	>0.016	Brown dwarf	
Swift J1749.4–2807	June 2006 (Swift/BAT)	518	8.82	>0.6	Main-sequence star	
Swift J1756.9–2508	June 2007 (Swift)	182	0.912	>0.0067	He white dwarf	
Aquila X-1	January 2008 (RXTE/PCA)	550.27	18.95	>0.56	K6-M0 main-sequence star	
NGC 6440 X-2	June 2008 (Chandra)	206	0.95	>0.0067	He white dwarf	
IGR J17511–3057	September 2009 (INTEGRAL)	245	3.47	>0.13	Main-sequence star	
IGR J17498–2921	August 2011 (INTEGRAL)	401	3.84	>0.17	Main-sequence star	
IGR J18245–2452	March 2013 (INTEGRAL)	254	11.03	>0.17	Main-sequence star	
MAXI J0911–655	February 2017 (XMM-Newton & NuSTAR)	339.97	0.74	>0.024	He white dwarf?	
IGR J17062–6143	February 2017 (RXTE)	163.65	0.63	>0.006	He white dwarf?	
IGR J16597–3704	February 2018 (NuSTAR & Swift)	105	0.77	>0.006	He white dwarf	
IGR J17379–3747	August 2018 (XMM-Newton)	468	1.88	>0.056	Brown dwarf	
IGR J17591–2342	October 2018 (NuSTAR & NICER)	527.4	18.95	>0.37	Main-sequence star	
MAXI J1816–195	June 2022 (MAXI)	528.6	4.8	>0.10		
SRGA J144459.2–604207	February 2024 (SRG)	447.9	5.22	>0.1	M-type main-sequence star?	
