= NGC 6652 =

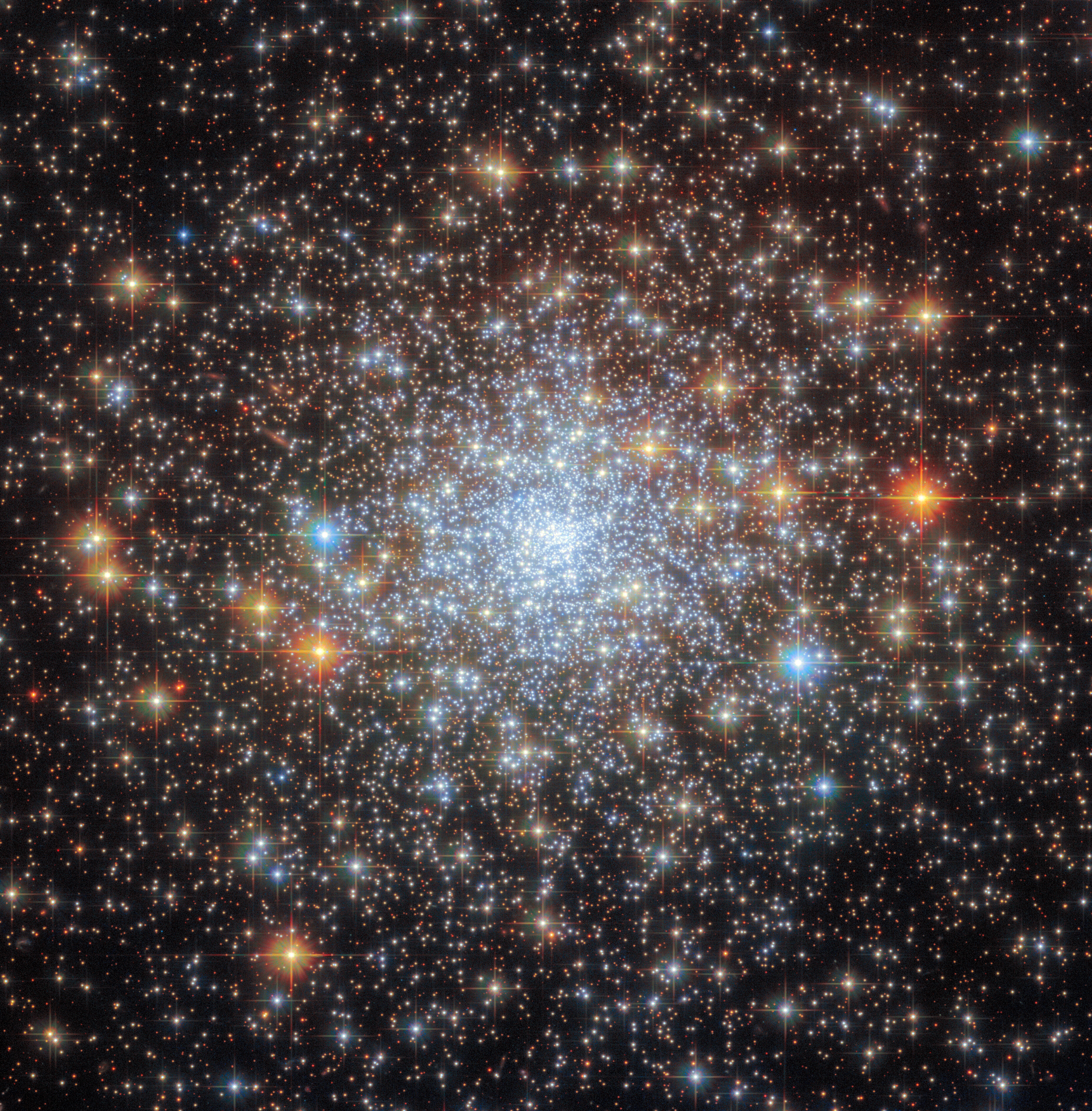
- NGC 6652 seen by the Hubble Space Telescope

Observation data
- Constellation: Sagittarius
- Right ascension: 18^{h} 35^{m} 45.63^{s}
- Declination: −32° 59′ 26.6″
- Distance: ~30,000
- Apparent magnitude (V): 9.75
- Apparent dimensions (V): 5.1' x 5.1'

Physical characteristics
- Estimated age: 13.6 billion years
- Other designations: NGC 6652, GCl 98, RX J1835.7-3259, 4FGL J1835.7-3258

NGC 6652 is a globular cluster in Sagittarius. It is located about 6,500 light years from the Galactic Center and about 30,000 light years away from Earth. The cluster was discovered on September 3, 1826 by James Dunlop.

== Observations ==
According to a study published in 2011 by J. Boyles and his colleagues, the metallicity of the globular cluster NGC 6652 is -0.81 and its mass is 109,000 M_{☉}. In the same study, the distance to the cluster is also estimated at approximately 10.0 kpc (∼32,600 ly). The study published by Forbes and Bridges indicates a metallicity of -0.70.

=== Stars ===
As of November 2022, 267 pulsars had been discovered in 36 globular clusters of the Milky Way. Out of 267 pulsars, two millisecond binary pulsars are located in NGC 6652. The first pulsar in this globular cluster was discovered using the Green Bank Telescope and is known as PSR J1835-3259A. Its period is 3.9 ms and it has an elliptical orbit with eccentricity of 0.95 and a period of 9.25 days. Assuming a mass of 1.4 M_{☉} the mass of its companion would be 0.74 M_{☉}. The second is PSR J1835−3259B, a millisecond pulsar with a period of 1.83 ms. It is in a nearly circular orbit around a companion with an estimated mass of about 0.2 M_{☉}, probably a white dwarf. This pulsar is probably the source of the gamma radiation from NGC 6652.

Finally, a third candidate was discovered in this cluster based on simultaneous observations from the Chandra X-ray Observatory and the Karl G. Jansky Very Large Array. It was given the name NGC 6652B and is possibly a transitional millisecond pulsar (tMSP), that is, a pulsar that switches between a rotationally powered state and an accretion-powered state. Other hypotheses must also be considered to explain the behavior of NGC 6625B, although less likely than the tMSP. Confirmation that it is indeed a tMSP will come from a direct observation of its state change.

Observations made with the Chandra X-ray Observatory have detected eleven X-ray sources, six of which were already known and five of which are new. Source A is a low-mass X-ray binary (LMXB). Source B suggests the presence of a neutron star in an LMXB system, but with unusual variability. The spectrum of source C suggests it is a cataclysmic variable. The spectrum of source D suggests the presence of a neutron star in an LMXB system, which would make it the third LMXB source of NGC 6652. Finally, sources E and F show spectra located relatively in the hard X-ray region, suggesting the presence of high-energy plasma.
