= Transitional millisecond pulsar =

Type of binary pulsar

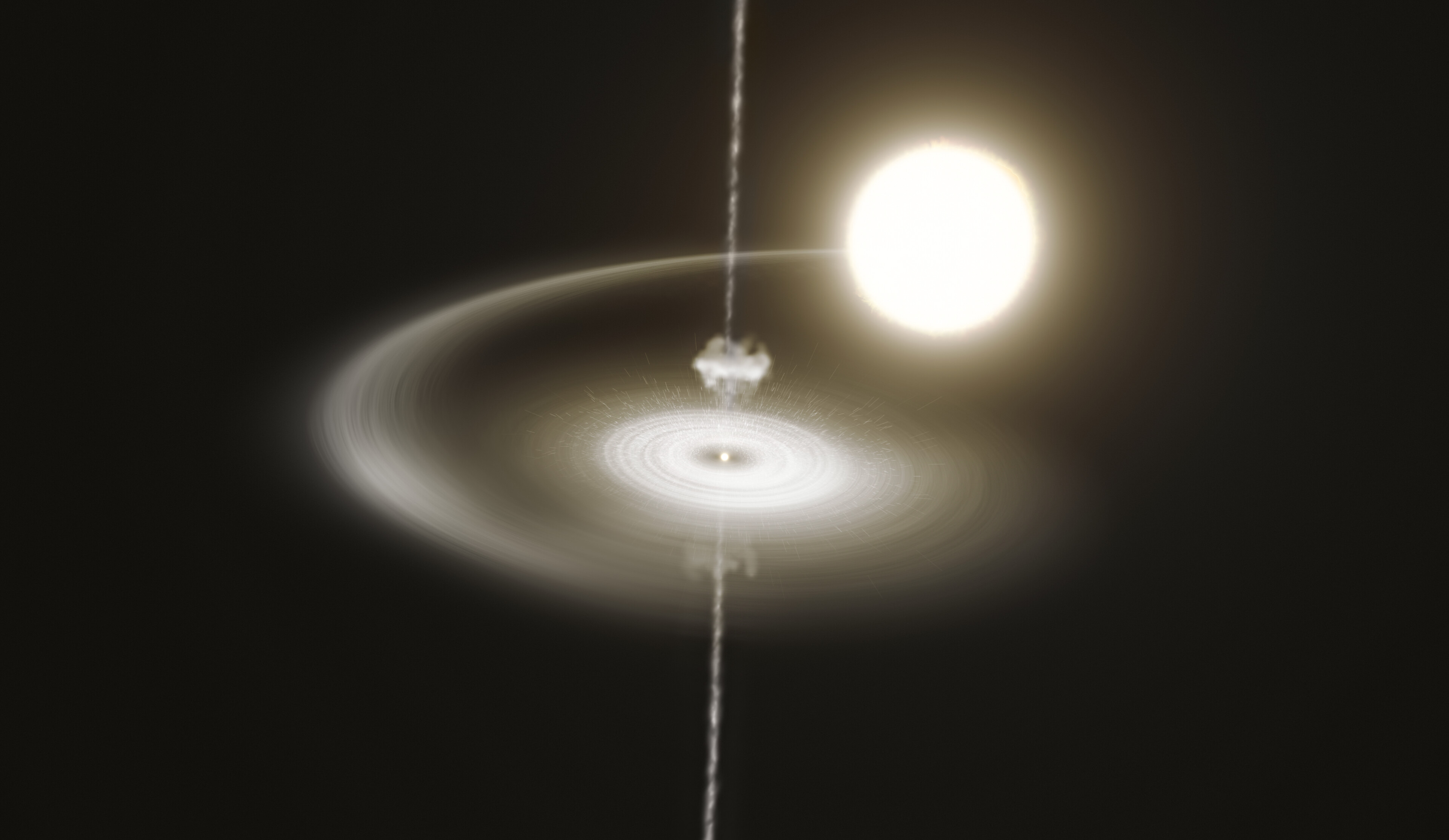
Artist's impression of tMSP PSR J1023+0038 during a phase of accretion

A transitional millisecond pulsar (tMSP) is a type of millisecond pulsar that alternates between accreting and non-accreting states. During the accretion disk state, the tMSP acts as a low-mass X-ray binary (LMXB) or accreting millisecond X-ray pulsar (AMXP). During the radio pulsar state, the tMSP acts as a millisecond radio pulsar (MSRP). Although rare and only recently discovered, tMSPs are important to scientists because they provide evidence for the recycling scenario—the idea that accretion spins up a pulsar to the millisecond range, and that X-ray pulsars and AMXPs evolve into MSRPs. As of October 2026, the only three confirmed tMSPs are PSR J1023+0038, IGR J1824–2452, and XSS J1227–4859.

== Properties ==
tMSPs have companions of 0.2–0.3 M_{☉} and orbital periods on the order of hours. Like spider pulsars, tMSPs have very low orbital eccentricities of ~10^{5}.

=== Accretion disk state ===
X-ray emission in tMSPs is relatively dim, although brighter than MSRPs and quiescent AMXPs, and can remain quasi-stable for years at a time. Accreting tMSPs can have 3 different states of increasing luminosity—the low, high, and flare states—and switch between these stages over very short times on the order of seconds. During all of these states, the tMSP's luminosity is 10^{33}–10^{34} erg/s, much lower than the typical ~10^{38} erg/s for LMXBs. Flares in tMSPs have been observed in X-ray, UV, visible, and near-IR wavelengths. During their high state, tMSPs show X-ray pulsations, suggesting that the pulsar is actively accreting. During the X-ray emission phase, the tMSP emits more radio waves and gamma rays than a typical pulsar; its radio emission is actually more similar to black holes.

=== Radio emission state ===
During the MSRP phase, tMSPs act like redback pulsars, a class of spider pulsars with 0.1–0.6 M_{☉} non-degenerate companions. They experience X-ray emission modulated by the binary's orbital period, radio pulsations with eclipses, gamma-ray pulsations, and outflows from the companion star. Eclipses of the radio pulsations are believed to be caused by thin, dense layer of plasma driven off of the companion star or the binary's Lagrange point by the pulsar's wind, which absorbs the radio waves. During the radio emission phase, the wind prevents matter from falling onto the neutron star.

== Observation ==
The first tMSP, PSR J1023+0038, was discovered in 2007 as a 1.7-ms radio pulsar with a low-mass companion. This position coincided with a previously-identified magnetic cataclysmic variable. However, by 2007, no evidence of an accretion disk around PSR J1023+0038 was found, suggesting it had transitioned fto an MSRP state. This was backed up in June 2013 when PSR J1023+0038 was observed switching back to a disk state.

In 2013, IGR J1824–2452 was identified as an outbursting LMXB. The position of the source coincided with a previously-identified MSRP, indicating that the pulsar had switched states. Also in 2013, archival evidence was found indicating that a previously-identified LMXB, XSS J1227–4859, had transitioned to an MSRP in 2012.

=== Importance ===
tMSPs are important because they demonstrate an evolutionary path for MSRPs. As early as the 1980s, the pulsar recycling scenario was proposed, suggesting that MSRPs are spun up to their extremely fast rotation rates by accretion of mass from a companion star during a long (billions of years) LMXB phase. Although the discovery of MSRPs in globular clusters, AMXPs, and X-ray transients supported this conclusion, but it was not until the discovery of tMSPs that definitive evidence of a pulsar switching between the two states was found. Although it is not yet clear whether tMSPs are an intermediate stage between AMXPs and MSRPs or if they are on a completely different evolutionary track, they are regardless useful for observing the interaction of a quickly-spinning, magnetized neutron star and plasma from a companion star over short timescales.

== Properties of known tMSPs ==
As of October 2026, there are 3 confirmed tMSPs and ~12 candidate tMSPs. In this table, the 3 confirmed tMSPs are listed first, followed by the candidates.

tMSP properties
Name	Rotational period (ms)	Orbital period (h)	X-ray luminosity (disk state) (10^{33} erg/s)	Radio luminosity (radio state) (10^{27} erg/s)
PSR J1023+0038	1.69	4.75	5.2 (average)	3800
IGR J1824–2452	3.93	11.03	11.2 (average)	
XSS J1227–4859	1.69	6.91	12 (average)	<0.37
4FGL J0407.7–5702			0.372	
3FGL J0427.9–6704		8.80	5	
4FGL J0540.0–7552			0.278	
4FGL J0639.1–8009			0.23	
CXOU J110926.4–650224			22	
3FGL J1544.6–1125		5.80	3.6	
4FGL J1702.7–5655		5.85		
4FGL J1824.2+1231				
Terzan 5 CX10			2	
XMM J174457–2850.3			1–10?	
