= TMSP =

TMSP may refer to:

- Telecom & Management SudParis, a group of two French Grande Ecole located in Évry, France
- Trimethylsilyl propionate, a solvent serving as internal reference in the spectrum in nuclear magnetic resonance
- Temple Mount Sifting Project, an archaeological project in Jerusalem.
- Transitional millisecond pulsar, a type of binary pulsar that alternates between accreting/X-ray emitting and radio-emitting states
