= MSRP (disambiguation) =

MSRP is the manufacturer's suggested retail price of a product.

MSRP may also refer to:

- Message Session Relay Protocol, a protocol used for multimedia communications
- Methodology of Scientific Research Programmes of Imre Lakatos
- Mile Square Regional Park, a regional park in Fountain Valley, California
- MSRP Motorsports, a former name of the HP Racing NASCAR team
- Mississippi Republican Party, the Mississippi state affiliate of the United States Republican Party
- Millisecond radio pulsar, a class of neutron stars
