= 47 Tucanae X9 =

X-ray binary

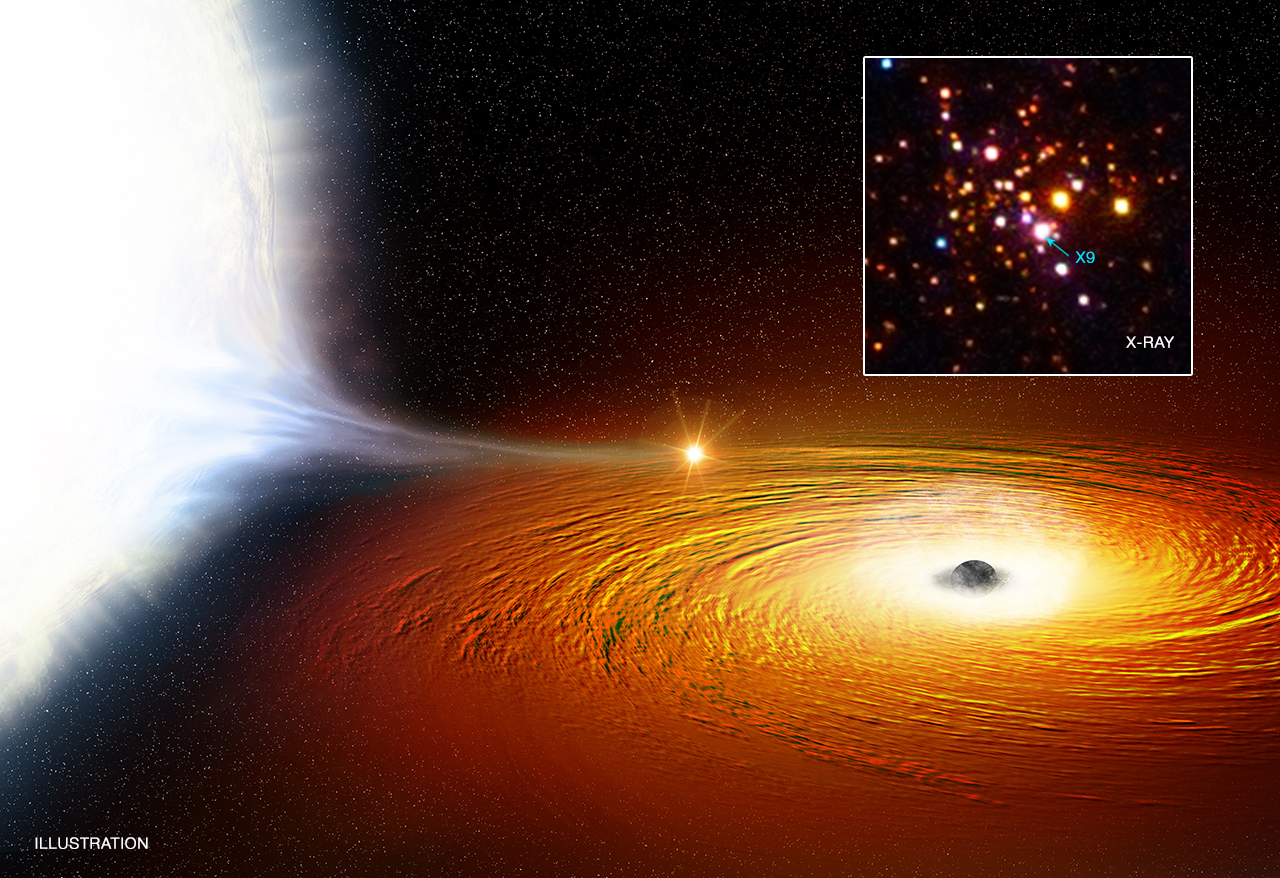
- Artistic representation of 47 Tucanae X9

Observation data Epoch J2000.0 Equinox ICRS
- Constellation: Tucana
- Right ascension: 00^{h} 24^{m} 04.26^{s}
- Declination: −72° 04′ 58.0″
- Apparent magnitude (V): 19.772

Characteristics
- Evolutionary stage: Black hole + white dwarf
- Spectral type: WD

Orbit
Period (P)	28.18 minutes

Other designations
- 47 Tuc X9, RX J0021.8-7221, CXOGlb J002404.2-720458

Database references
SIMBAD	data

47 Tucanae X9 (also known as 47 Tuc X9) is an ultracompact low-mass X-ray binary (LMXB) located within the globular cluster 47 Tucanae, one of the brightest and most massive globular cluster in the Milky Way Galaxy, situated approximately 14,800 light-years away in the constellation of Tucana. The system is notable for being the first confirmed black hole-white dwarf binary in the Milky Way, with an exceptionally short orbital period of approximately 28.18 minutes.

== Discovery and observations ==
47 Tuc X9 was discovered using NASA Chandra X-ray Observatory, NuSTAR and the Australia Telescope Compact Array (ATCA). Initially the system was classified as a cataclysmic variable with a white dwarf primary, subsequent radio and X-ray observations reclassified it as an LMXB with a black hole. An alternative hypothesis of a neutron star (possibly a transitional millisecond pulsar) was considered but deemed less likely due to the absence of pulsations and the system's ultracompact orbit.

== Formation and evolution ==
The ultracompact orbit of 47 Tuc X9 likely resulted from dynamical interactions in the dense environment of 47 Tucanae, such as a black hole capturing a white dwarf or evolving from a black hole/helium-star binary through mass transfer and gravitational wave emission. The high stellar density of the globular cluster facilitates the formation of such compact binaries.
