= SAX J1808.4−3658 =

Neutron star in the constellation Sagittarius

Observation data Epoch J2000.0 Equinox ICRS
- Constellation: Sagittarius
- Right ascension: 18^{h} 08^{m} 27.54^{s}
- Declination: −36° 58′ 44.3″
- Apparent magnitude (V): 16.51
Spectral type	Neutron star

Other designations
- V4580 Sgr, PSR J1808−3658, SWIFT J1808.5−3655, INTREF 881, XTE J1808−369

Database references
SIMBAD	data

SAX J1808.4−3658 is a millisecond pulsar in the constellation of Sagittarius. It was the first accreting millisecond pulsar discovered in 1998 by the Italian-Dutch BeppoSAX satellite, which revealed X-ray pulsations at the 401 Hz neutron star spin frequency when it was observed during a subsequent outburst in 1998 by NASA's RXTE satellite. The neutron star is orbited by a brown dwarf binary companion with a likely mass of 0.05 solar masses, every 2.01 hours. X-ray burst oscillations and quasi-periodic oscillations in addition to coherent X-ray pulsations have been seen from SAX J1808.4-3658, making it a Rosetta stone for interpretation of the timing behavior of low-mass X-ray binaries. Paul Roche et al. discovered an optical counterpart to the X-ray source, in 1998. Its brightness varies, so in the year 2000 it was given its variable star designation, V4580 Sagittarii.

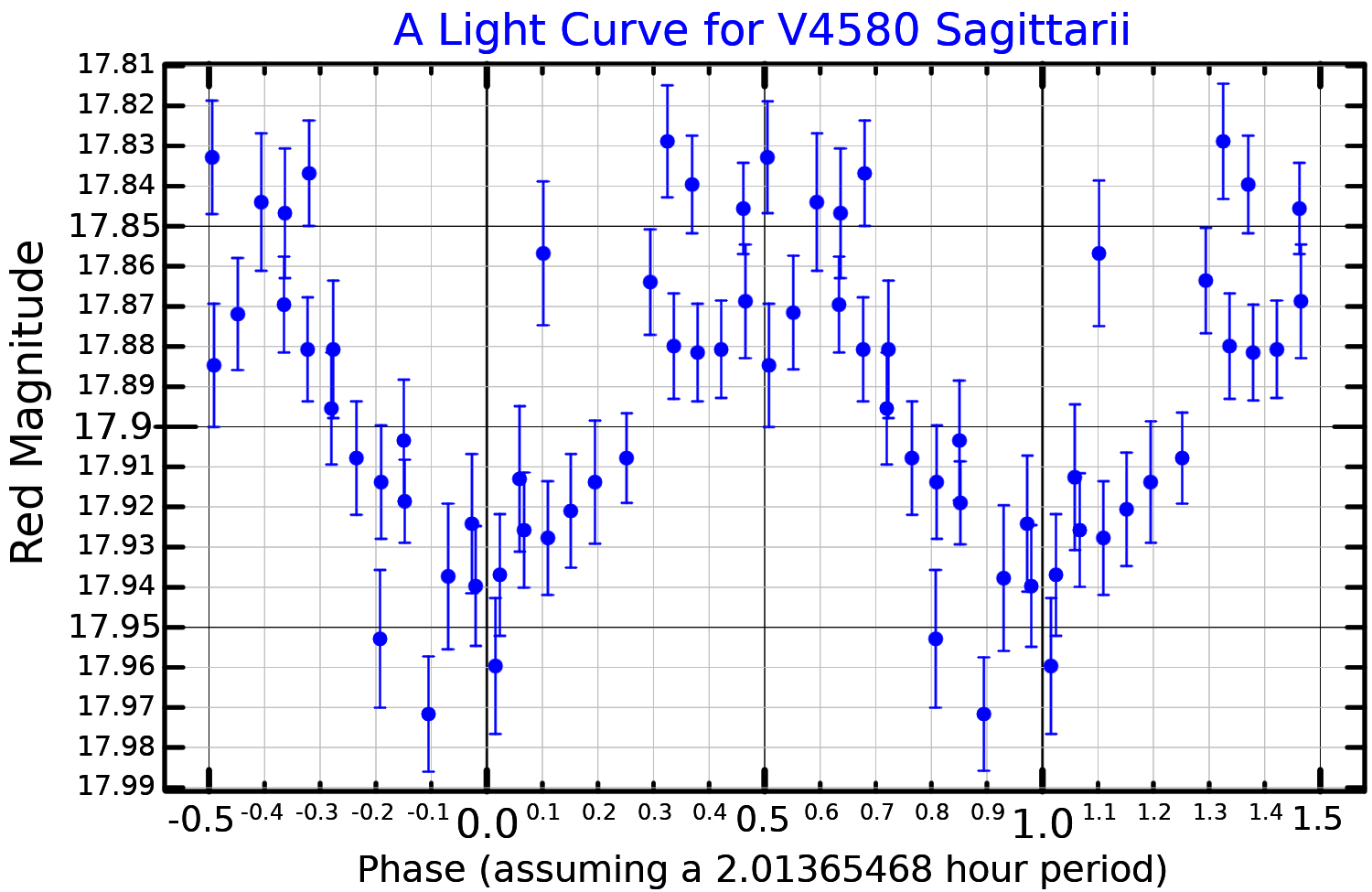
A red band light curve for V4580 Sagittarii, adapted from Elebert et al. (2009)

These accreting millisecond X-ray pulsars are thought to be the evolutionary progenitors of recycled radio millisecond pulsars. A total of thirteen accreting millisecond X-ray pulsars have been discovered as of January 2011. Three of them are Intermittent millisecond X-ray pulsars (HETE J1900.1-2455, Aql X-1 and SAX J1748.9-2021), i.e. they emit pulsations sporadically during the outburst.

On 21 August 2019 (UTC; 20 August in the US), Neutron Star Interior Composition Explorer (NICER) spotted the brightest X-ray burst so far observed. It came from SAX J1808.4−3658.
