= Aquila X-1 =

Star in the constellation Aquila

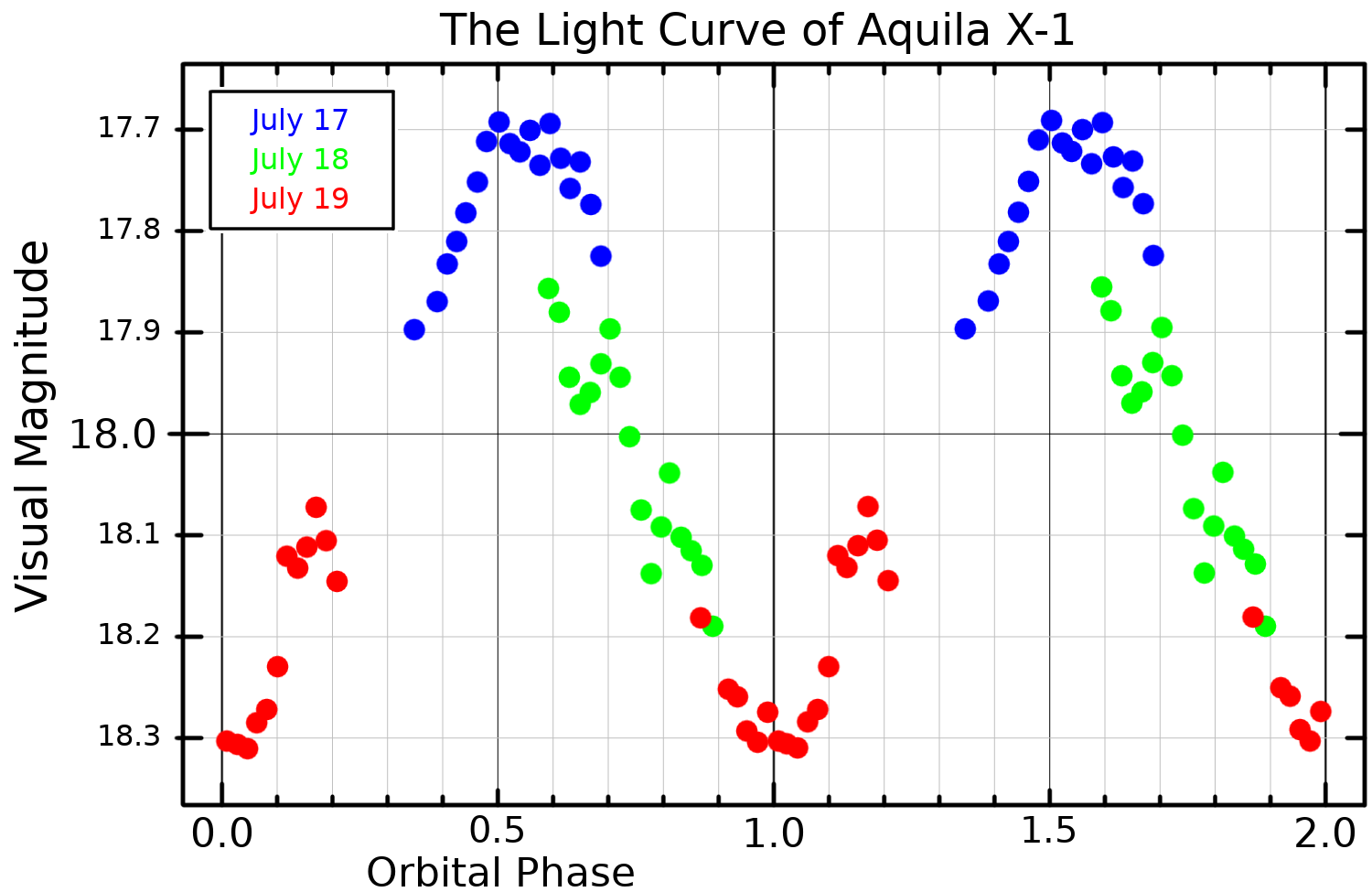
- A visual band light curve for Aquila X-1 during a July 1996 outburst, adapted from Garcia et al. (1999)

Observation data Epoch J2000.0 Equinox ICRS
- Constellation: Aquila
- Right ascension: 19^{h} 11^{m} 16.05720^{s}
- Declination: +00° 35′ 05.8767″

Characteristics
- Spectral type: K4
- Variable type: LMXB

Details
Mass	>1.2 M_{☉}
Mass	<0.76 M_{☉}

Other designations
- V1333 Aql, 2MASS J19111604+0035058

Database references
SIMBAD	data

Aquila X-1 (frequently abbreviated to Aql X-1) is a low-mass x-ray binary (LMXB) and the most luminous X-Ray source in the constellation Aquila. It was first observed by the satellite Vela 5B which detected several outbursts from this source between 1969 and 1976. Its optical counterpart is variable, so it was named V1333 Aql according to the IAU standards. The system hosts a neutron star that accretes matter from a main sequence star of spectral type K4. The binary's orbital period is 18.9479 hours.

Aquila X-1 is an atoll source. The neutron star radiation flux is slightly variable due to the nuclear burning of the accreted helium on the surface.
