= TianQin =

Proposed space-borne gravitational-wave observatory

- Location(s): outer space

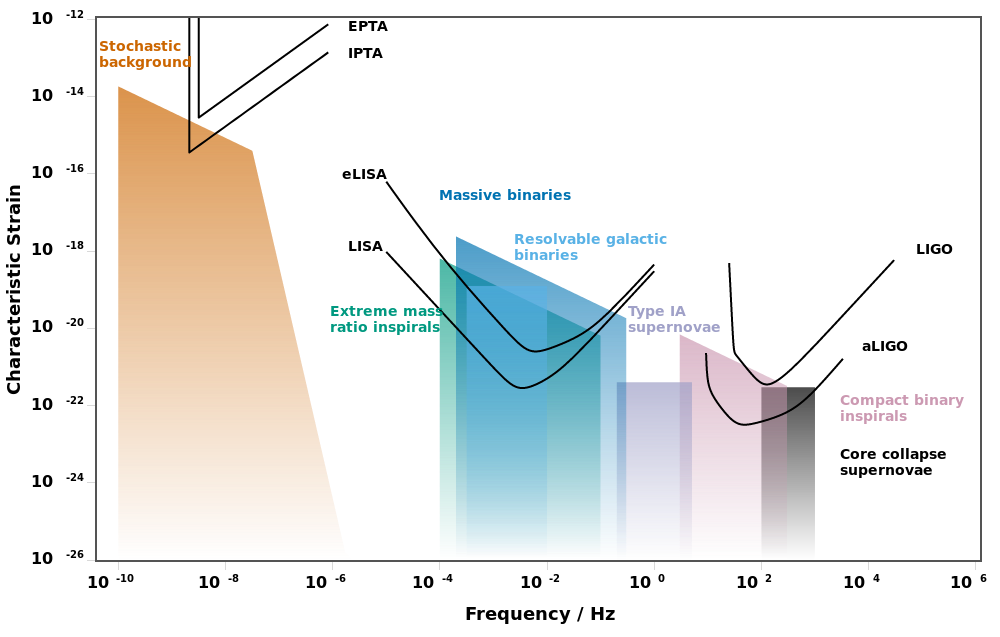

The TianQin Project (Chinese: 天琴计划) is a proposed space-borne gravitational-wave observatory (gravitational-wave detector) consisting of three spacecraft in Earth orbit.

== History ==
The TianQin project is being led by Professor Luo Jun (Chinese: 罗俊), President of Sun Yat-sen University, and is based in the university's Zhuhai campus. Construction on project-related infrastructure, which will include a research building, ultra-quiet cave laboratory, and observation center, began in March 2016. The project is estimated to cost 15 billion RMB (US$2.3 billion), with a projected completion date in the mid-2030s. In December 2019, China launched Tianqin-1, a technology demonstration.

The project's name combines the Chinese words "Tian", meaning heavenly or celestial, and "Qin", a type of traditional instrument in Chinese musical culture. This name refers to the metaphorical concept of gravitational waves "plucking the strings" by causing fluctuations in the 100,000 kilometer laser beams stretching between each of the three TianQin spacecraft.

The observatory will consist of three identical drag-free controlled spacecraft in high Earth orbits at an altitude of about 100,000 km. The nominal source of the observatory is a white-dwarf binary RX J0806.3+1527 (also known as HM Cancri). This could serve as a good calibration source for the TianQin gravitational wave observatory. Similar configuration of geocentric orbit space-borne gravitational wave detectors have been developed since 2011, and was shown to have favorable properties for observing intermediate-mass and massive black-hole binaries.

Apart from Galactic binaries, the TianQin observatory can also detect sources like massive black hole binaries, extreme mass ratio inspirals, stellar-mass black hole binary inspirals, and stochastic gravitational wave background, etc.

The detection rate for massive black hole binaries is expected to be as high as about 60 per year, and TianQin would have accurate estimate to the source's parameters, which enable the potential for distinguishing the seed models for massive black holes, as well as issuing early warning for nearby mergers. It can also be used to test the no-hair theorem or constrain modified gravity.
