= Atoll source =

Type of low-mass X-ray binary

In astrophysics, an atoll source is a type of bright low-mass X-ray binary (LMXB) containing a neutron star accreting off of another star. Atoll sources have relatively weak magnetic fields and low luminosities, typically accreting at less than 10% of the Eddington limit. An atoll source can be distinguished from a Z source, another type of LMXB, by the shape of its X-ray color-color diagram. Atoll sources go through two main states as they move through the color-color diagram: the banana state and the island state, named after their characteristic shapes on the diagram. In the banana state, an LMXB has brighter luminosities and higher accretion rates compared to the island state.

== Properties ==
Atoll sources are a type of bright, low-mass x-ray binary containing a weakly magnetized neutron star and another object, mass from which is accreting onto the neutron star. They have luminosities of 10^{36}–10^{38} erg/s and magnetic fields of approximately 10^{8} G.

Atoll sources can experience quasi-periodic oscillations and relativistic reflection.

== Difference from Z sources ==
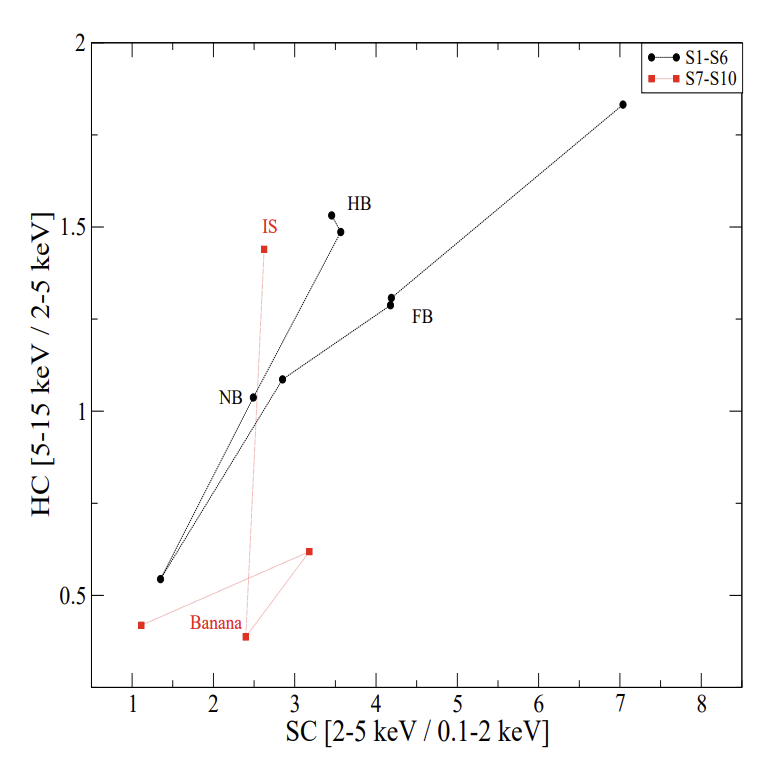
A comparison of typical atoll source (red) and Z source (black) tracks on an X-ray color-color diagram

Atoll sources can be distinguished from Z sources by analyzing their X-ray color-color diagrams. These diagrams compare the ratios of emission of two ranges of high-energy X-ray wavelengths ("hard X-rays") and two ranges of low-energy X-ray wavelengths ("soft X-rays"). When plotted on such a diagram, Z sources have three-branched shapes that look similar to the letter "Z", while atoll sources have long, curved branches and isolated clumps that are reminiscent of an atoll. Atoll sources take longer to move all the way through the diagram, approximately 30–100 days, while Z sources can move through the entire diagram in hours to days.

Atoll sources tend to be less luminous than Z sources, accreting mass less quickly, but luminosity ranges overlap. Atoll sources also have much larger variation in X-ray intensity and energy spectrum than Z sources. X-ray bursting, caused by the unstable nuclear fusion of material accreted onto the neutron star, is generally only seen in atoll sources, with Z sources experiencing longer-lasting X-ray flares instead.

== Island and banana states ==
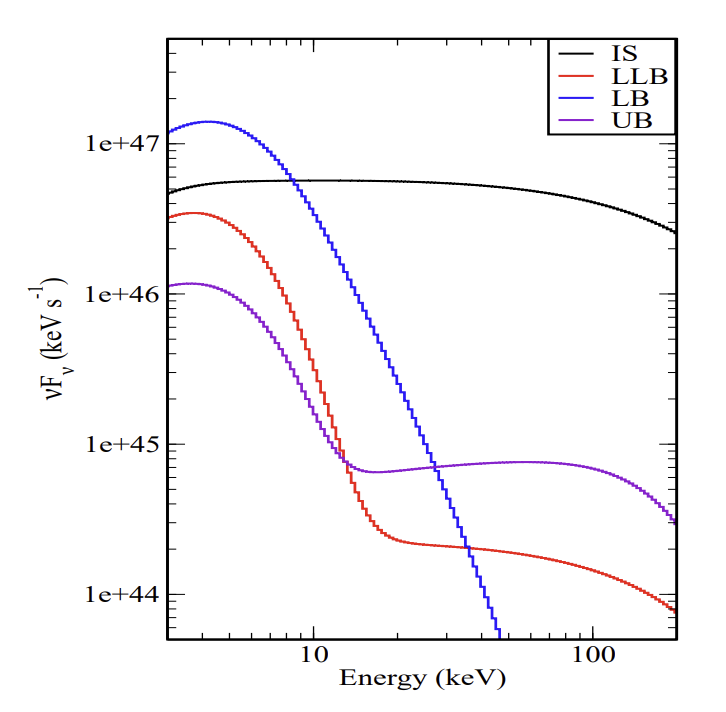
Spectral variations of an atoll source in the island state (black), lower left banana state (red), lower banana state (blue) and upper banana state (purple)

An atoll source can have one of two states: the island state and the banana state. The island state corresponds to isolated clumps on the color-color diagram. The banana state corresponds to the curved branch on the color-color diagram. Atoll sources move along the color-color diagram periodically. They always move between banana and island states from the left end of the banana branch.

LMXBs have higher luminosities and mass accretion rates in the banana state than in the island state. In the banana state, the energy level of emitted X-rays remains approximately constant across luminosities, while in the island state, X-rays tend to be harder at lower luminosities. X-ray bursts within the island state tend to last much longer than X-ray bursts within the banana state. Quasi-periodic oscillations occur in the island and lower banana states, but not in the upper banana state; this may be caused by disruptions by the neutron star's magnetic field at higher luminosities.

It has been suggested that the banana state may represent a period of thermal equilibrium between the accretion disk corona and the blackbody radiation of the neutron star. In the island state, the thermal equilibrium breaks and the corona becomes much hotter than the neutron star's blackbody temperature. It has also been theorized that in the island state, the accretion disk truncates before reaching the neutron star's surface and is mostly optically thin, while in the banana state, the disk moves inward and becomes optically thick.

== Notable atoll sources ==
- Aquila X-1
- 4U 1820-30
- 4U 0614+091
- 4U 1608-52
- XTE J1739-285
