= Spider pulsar =

Class of millisecond pulsars

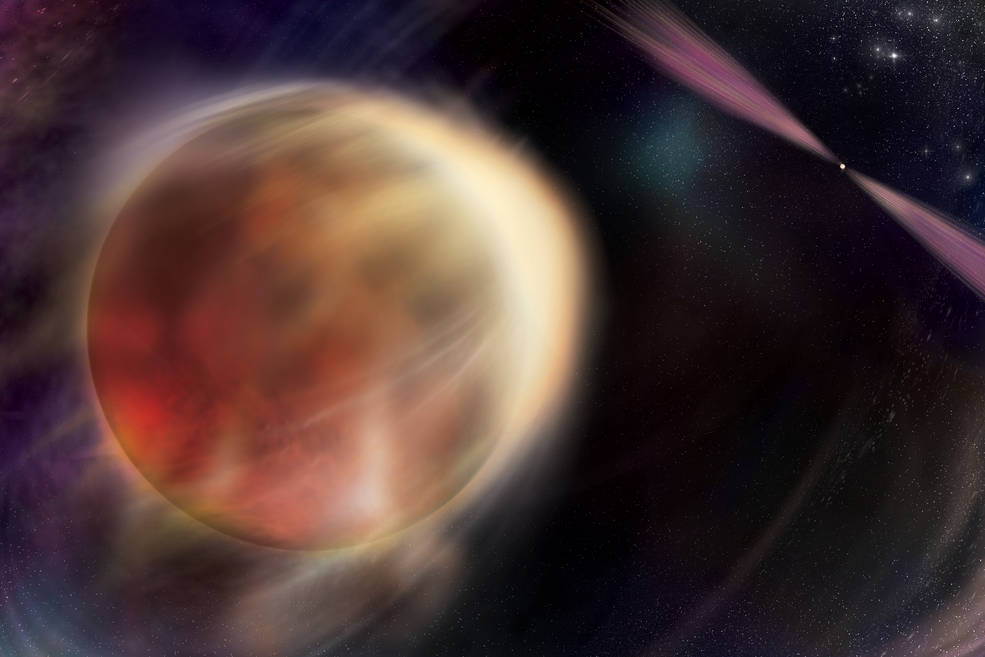
Artist's impression of a spider pulsar system, where a pulsar's intense ionizing radiation ablates the atmosphere of a closely-orbiting companion.

Spider pulsars are a class of millisecond pulsars that occur in tight binary systems with a low-mass, non-degenerate companion, such as a star or substellar object. In these systems the companion orbits the spider pulsar so closely that it experiences extreme heating and ablation by the pulsar's intense ionizing winds. Spider pulsars are divided into three broad subclasses, depending on the mass and orbital period of their companions: these are black widows, redbacks, and huntsmans. These subclasses are named after species of cannibalistic spiders, which consume their mates in a similar manner to how spider pulsars gradually destroy their companions.

== Background ==
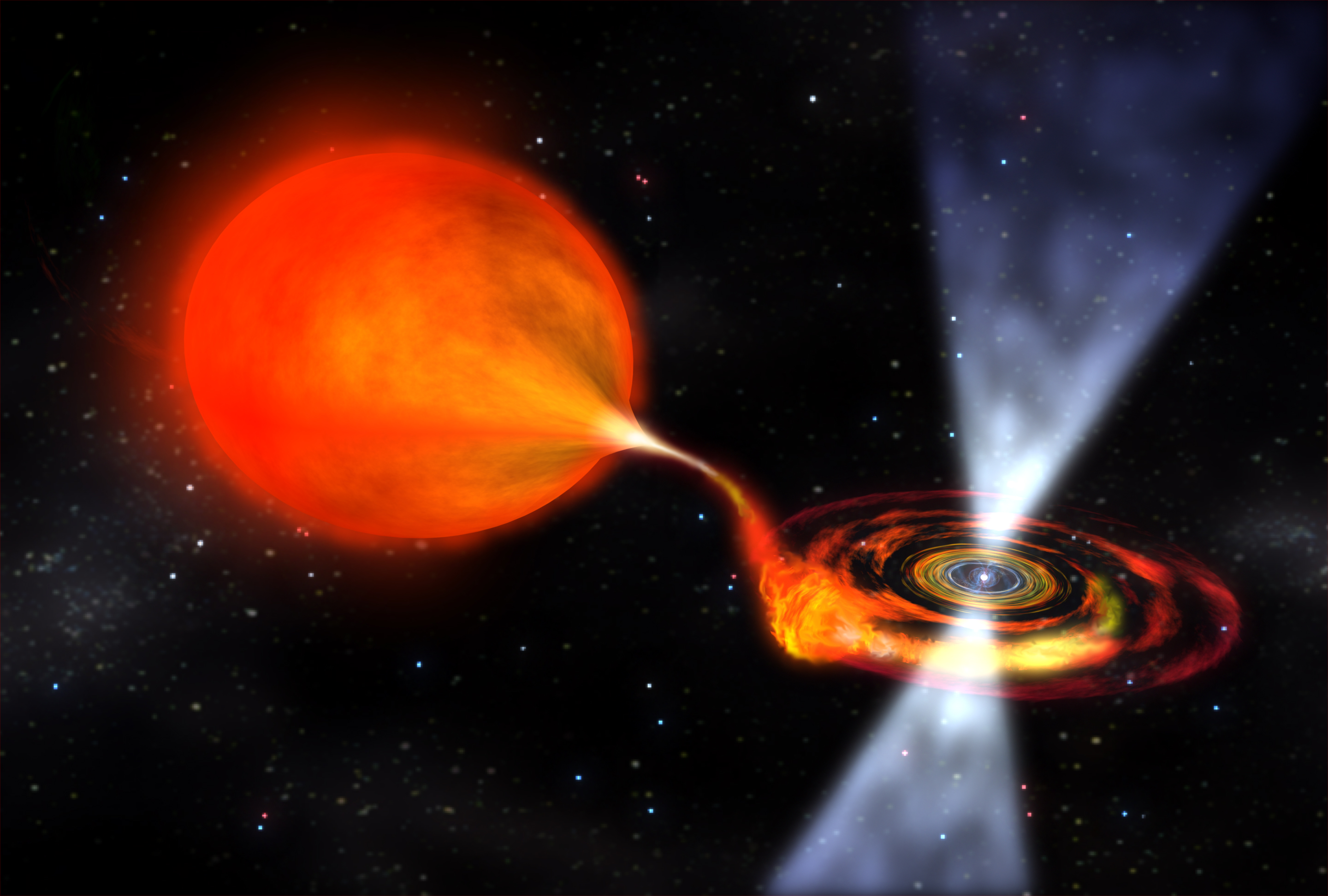
Artist's impression of a millisecond pulsar accreting matter from its stellar companion

Pulsars are rapidly-spinning neutron stars that form after a massive star ends its life in a core-collapse supernova. While pulsars have a wide range of rotation periods, there is a distinct population of pulsars that have very short rotation periods on the order of milliseconds—these are known as millisecond pulsars. Millisecond pulsars are observed to commonly occur in binary systems where they are orbited by a smaller-mass companion, which may be a star, substellar object, or a white dwarf.

Millisecond pulsars are believed to have attained their rapid rotation from accreting matter from their companions. This occurs when the companion orbits close enough for the pulsar to gravitationally pull matter directly from its atmosphere—a process known as Roche lobe overflow. As the pulsar accretes matter from its companion, the pulsar acquires angular momentum and speeds up its rotation, while the companion shrinks in size and mass. Eventually, the companion shrinks enough that the pulsar can no longer pull matter from it, ceasing accretion in the pulsar. The stripped companion has now become a low-stellar-mass or substellar remnant which may be degenerate; such objects may be a helium star, white dwarf, carbon-rich planet, or brown dwarf.

Pulsars emit high amounts of ionizing radiation (X-rays, gamma rays, electrons, etc.) due to their extremely hot surface temperatures (a few million kelvin) and extremely strong rotating magnetic fields (more than a billion gauss). Due to the high energy and intensity of the pulsar's radiation, it exerts a very strong radiation pressure that ionizes and blows gases away from the pulsar, creating an energetic stream of fast-moving charged particles known as pulsar wind (akin to the Sun's solar wind). In tight binary systems where the companion closely orbits a pulsar (orbital period less than 2 days), the pulsar's high-energy radiation and wind heats the companion up to temperatures of thousands of kelvin, resulting in the thermal inflation and evaporation (ablation) of the companion. Ionized gases escaping from the ablating companion are blown away by the pulsar's wind, creating a dense stream of plasma emanating from the ablating companion. At very far distances from the pulsar, the pulsar's wind becomes slow and diffuse enough that it begins interacting with the interstellar medium, producing a bow shock that glows in optical, ultraviolet, and X-ray light.

== Definition and classification ==
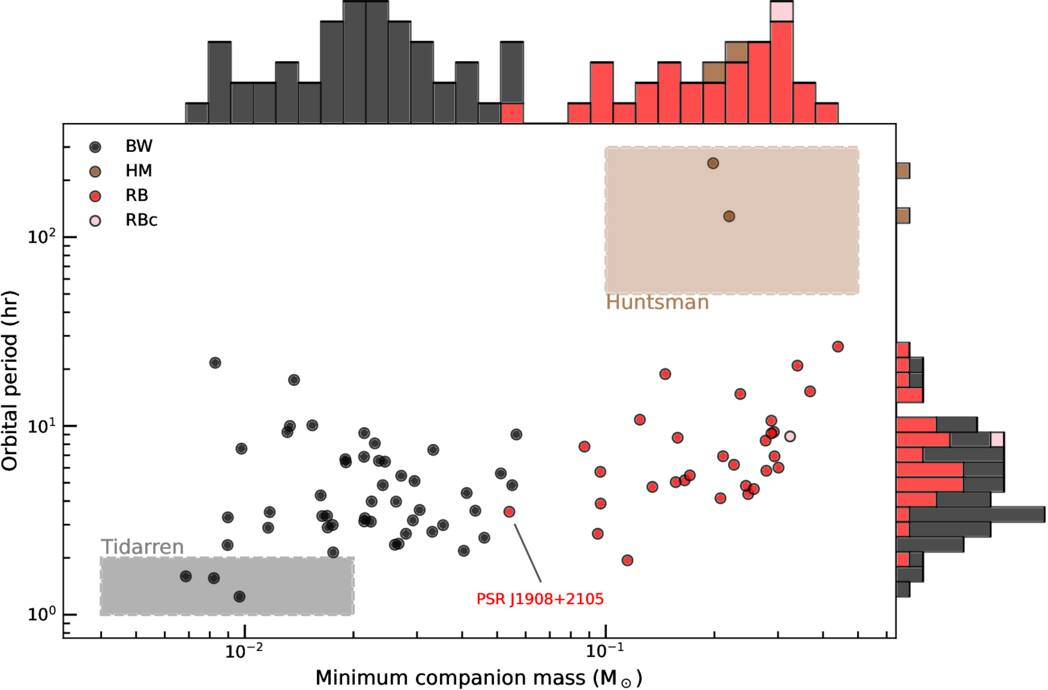
Known spider pulsar systems as of November 2025, plotted by minimum companion mass and orbital period. Datapoints are color-coded by spider pulsar subclass.

Spider pulsars refer to tight binary systems that contain a millisecond pulsar and a smaller, non-degenerate companion (which may be a star or substellar object, but not a white dwarf or neutron star). In the scientific literature spider pulsars are commonly stated to have orbital periods less than a day. Spider pulsar systems are typically observed exhibiting signs of pulsar accretion and companion ablation, though these are not necessary for the definition of spider pulsars. Compared to other types of millisecond pulsars, spider pulsars generally have faster spins and more massive neutron stars. Spider pulsars make up about 15–20% of fully spun-up millisecond pulsars with known companion classifications.

The Norwegian University of Science and Technology maintains a public online catalogue of known spider pulsars, called "SpiderCat". The SpiderCat catalogue was established by Karri Koljonen and Manuel Linares in 2025, who delineate a quantitative definition of spider pulsars with the following three criteria:

1. a pulsar spin period less than 30 milliseconds (< 30 ms)
2. a companion orbital period less than or equal to 10 days (≲ 10 days)
3. a non-degenerate or semi-degenerate companion star (inferred from radio eclipses, X-ray mode switching, optical spectra or X-ray/optical orbital modulation)

Based on the estimated minimum mass of their companion, spider pulsars are divided into two major subclasses: black widows and redbacks. Both of these subclasses describe compact binary systems with orbital periods less than 1 day. A third minor class of spider pulsars, called huntsmans, have stellar-mass companions similar to redbacks, but have more distant orbits with periods between 2 and 10 days.

=== Black widows ===
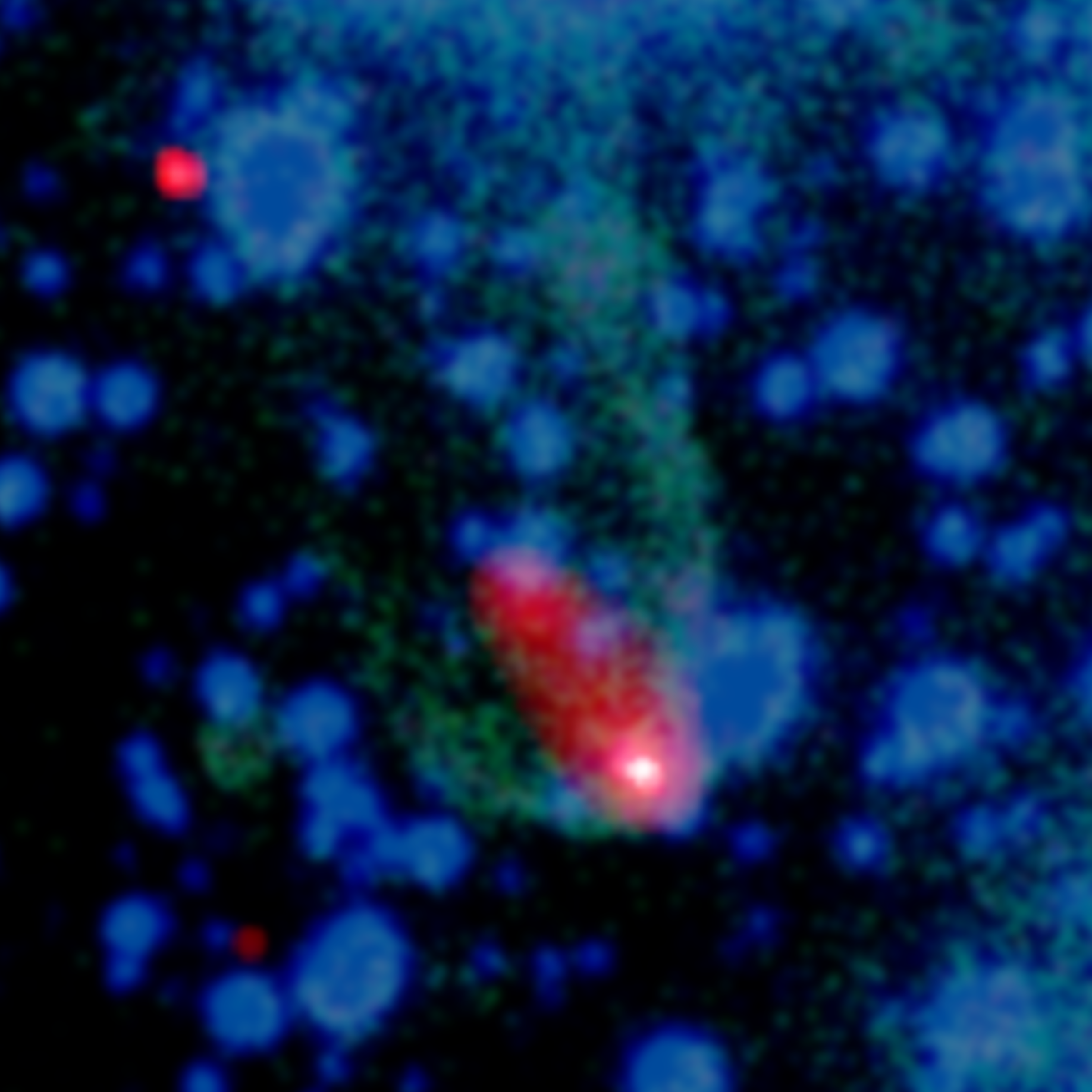
Composite image of the Black Widow pulsar (PSR B1957+20) in X-ray (red and white) and optical (green and blue) wavelengths. The pulsar's intense radiation creates a visible bow shock (in green) as it moves through the interstellar medium.

Black widow pulsars have non-planetary substellar companions with masses between 0.004 and 0.1 solar masses (M_{☉}). This subclass derives its name from its prototype PSR B1957+20, which was discovered in 1986–1988 and nicknamed the "Black Widow pulsar" by David Eichler and Amir Levinson. The Black Widow pulsar itself was named after the black widow spider, whose behavior of cannibalizing their mates resembles the pulsar's gradual destruction of its companion. In black widows, the companion star is usually tidally locked, leaving the side of the star facing the pulsar much hotter than the side facing away due to the heating effects of pulsar wind, which can in turn cause intense stellar winds from the companion.

Compared to redbacks, black widows have slightly shorter orbital periods. Additionally, optical emission lines are seen more commonly in black widows than in redbacks.

Several of the most massive known neutron stars belong in black widow systems, with at least five having estimated masses above 2.1 M_{☉}.

As of 2026, 54 black widow pulsars and four black widow candidates have been discovered.

==== Tidarrens ====
Tidarren pulsars are a subclass of black widow pulsars that have companion masses between 0.004 and 0.02 M_{☉} and orbital periods shorter than 2 hours. With very low companion masses, these binaries can have high mass ratios of over 150, making them examples of extreme mass ratio binaries. For this reason, this subclass is named after the black widow relative Tidarren sisyphoides, which are known for having an extreme female-to-male mass ratio. The name and classification of tidarren pulsars was introduced by Roger W. Romani and collaborators in 2016, after the first few tidarrens were discovered. Tidarrens are believed to represent the late evolutionary stage of black widow systems, and may be the progenitors of planetary-mass objects around millisecond pulsars. Their spectra suggest they contain low abundances of hydrogen.

=== Redbacks ===
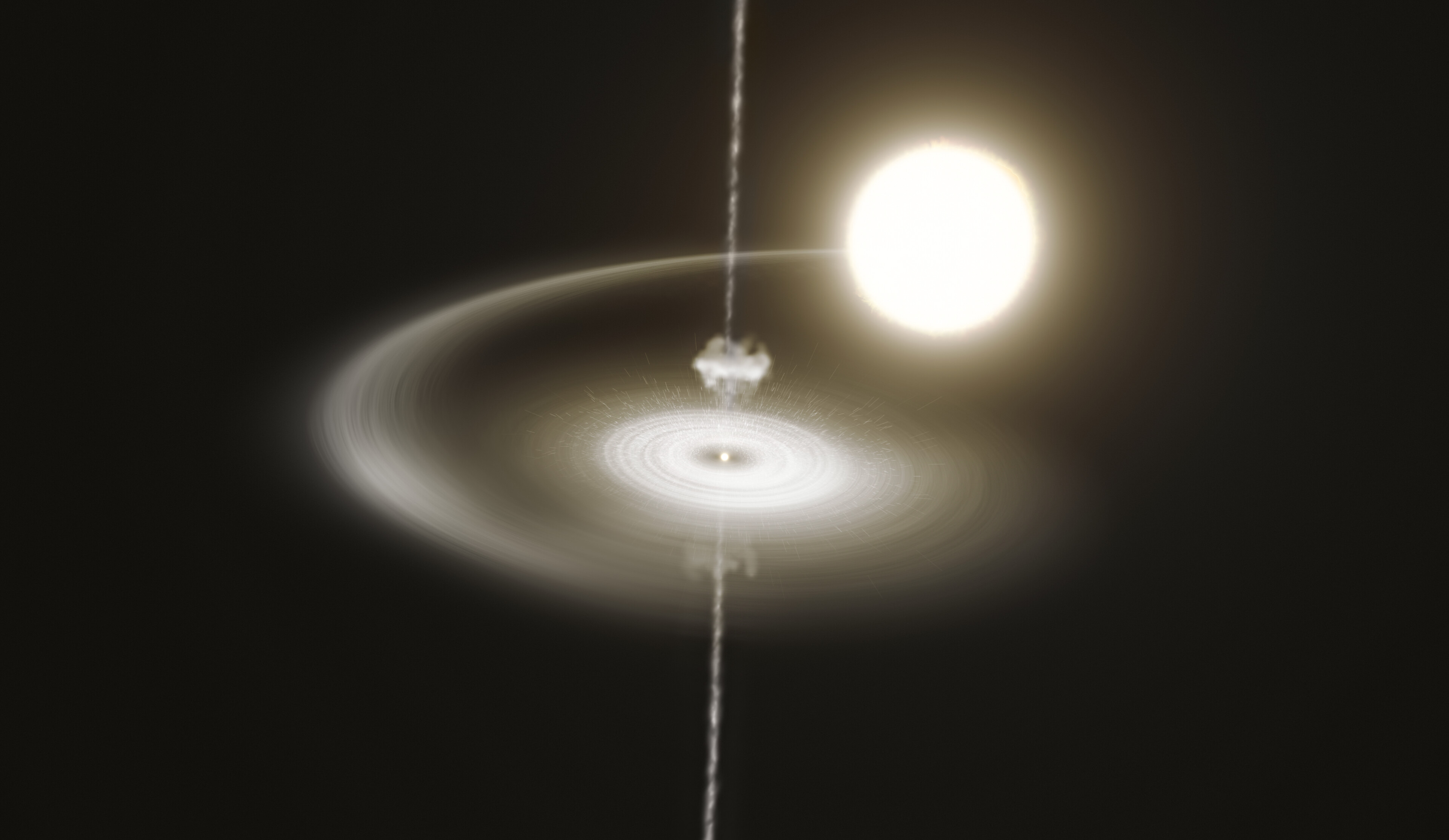
Artist's impression of redback pulsar PSR J1023+0038 accreting off of its companion. Material ejected by pulsar wind can be seen as a cloud of very small dots surrounding the pulsar.

Redback pulsars have main-sequence star companions that are more massive than 0.1 M_{☉}. This subclass is named after the redback spider, an Australian spider related to black widows. The first redback pulsar (PSR J1740−5340) was discovered by D'Amico et al. in 2001, though the term "redback" was introduced later by Mallory Roberts in 2010. (Note: In a 2017 review paper on millisecond pulsars, Richard Manchester cites a 2013 conference paper by Mallory Roberts for the coining of "redback". However, Roberts mentioned the term in an earlier conference paper from 2010.) Compared to black widows, redbacks have brighter and harder X-ray emission.

Redbacks are thought to be a link between low-mass X-ray binaries and millisecond radio pulsars. The redback pulsar PSR J1023+0038 was originally identified as a low-mass X-ray binary (LMXB). Before 2002, astronomers clearly observed an accretion disk in the system; since then, the disk has disappeared. However, in 2007, radio pulsations from PSR J1023+0038 were detected, and other phenomena characteristic of millisecond pulsars have also been observed since. It is believed that during this period, the system transitioned from an LMXB to a redback pulsar.

As of 2026, 34 redback pulsars and 36 redback candidates have been observed.

=== Huntsmans ===
Huntsman pulsars have massive and distant stellar companions orbital periods between 2 and 10 days, an order of magnitude larger than redbacks. Their name was coined by Samuel Swihart and his colleagues in 2017, referencing the huntsman spider, a type of spider that does not engage in sexual cannibalism. Very few huntsmans and huntsman candidates have been found; as of 2026, there were only two confirmed huntsmans, PSR J1417–4402 and PSR J1947–1120. Huntsman systems are believed to achieve Roche lobe overflow after the companion star has exhausted its hydrogen core, during the red giant phase. It is possible that huntsman systems, rather than a separate subtype, are a specific evolutionary stage of spider pulsars.

== Evolution ==
The companions of spider pulsars are generally thought to be remnants of former stars, stripped down by the pulsar via ablation and accretion. It is hypothesized that the ablating companion's mass shrinks over time, which implies that redbacks should evolve into black widows. However, observations have shown that the masses of black widow companions are distinct from those of redback companions—there is a lack of spider pulsars with companion masses at the 0.1 M_{☉} dividing line. For this reason, the evolutionary relation between black widows and redbacks remains controversial among astrophysicists. Some believe that redbacks and black widows have a common origin and then diverge along two separate evolutionary tracks, while others argue that redbacks are the evolutionary predecessors of black widows.

It has also been suggested that black widows in globular clusters may have originally been wide-orbit millisecond pulsars with white dwarf companions which exchanged them with main-sequence stars near the main-sequence turnoff point. Then the new companions evolved and filled their Roche lobes, with the excess gas ejected from the system. However, some doubt has been cast upon this theory with the increasing number of detections of black widows in the galactic field in recent years.

It is possible that ablation in spider pulsars could cause their binary partners to completely evaporate. This process may explain the fast spin of millisecond isolated pulsars, which have been spun up to very fast speeds despite the apparent absence of a companion.

== Detection methods ==
Spider pulsars can be detected by their radio and gamma-ray emission. However, in order to be detected in radio, a radio telescope must be sufficiently sensitive to pulsars with fast spins and orbital periods.

=== Radio eclipses ===
Radio eclipses are periodic disappearances of radio pulsations from the neutron star, sometimes lasting for a significant fraction of the orbital period. Despite their name, these eclipses are too long to be fully explained by occultation by the companion star. They are instead attributed to the dispersion, scattering, and absorption of radio emission by material in between the two stars (intra-binary material). Extensive radio eclipses are more common in redbacks than in black widows.

=== Gamma-ray eclipses ===
Gamma-ray eclipses are periodic disappearances of gamma-ray pulsations from the neutron star. Unlike radio eclipses, gamma ray eclipses are not caused by interaction between the gamma-ray emission and intra-binary material–there is not enough matter present to absorb all of the high-energy gamma rays. Instead, they are likely solely caused by occultation of the neutron star by the companion star. Gamma-ray eclipses (or a lack thereof) can therefore constrain the binary's orbital inclination, as the inclination must be within a certain range for occultation to be observed.

== Observational history ==
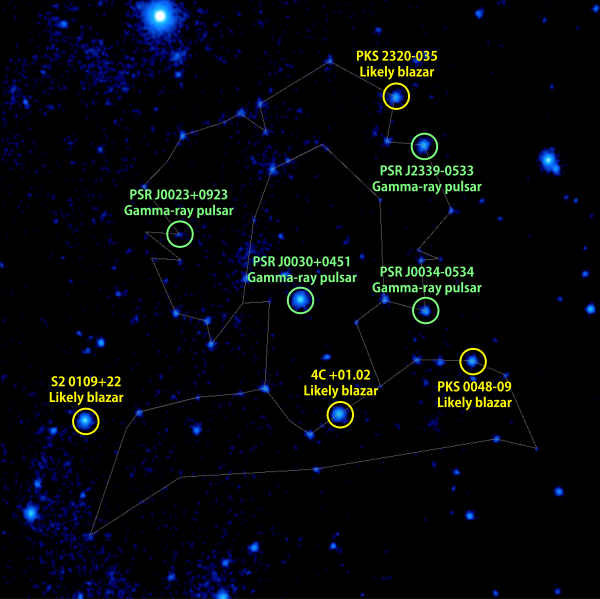
An asterism of Albert Einstein made from Fermi gamma-ray data. Two of the "stars", PSR J0023+0923 and PSR 2339–0553, are spider pulsars.

The first spider pulsar discovered was PSR B1957+20, an eclipsing binary black widow discovered in 1986 by the Arecibo Observatory. The discovery of PSR B1957+20 was announced in May 1988 by Andrew S. Fruchter, Daniel R. Stinebring, and Joseph H. Taylor, and it received the nickname of "Black Widow pulsar" by David Eichler and Amir Levinson in December 1988.

The launch of NASA's Fermi Gamma-ray Space Telescope significantly improved the ability to detect spider pulsars. Before the launch of the telescope, only three spider pulsars were known. Fermi gamma-ray observations show astronomers where to look for candidate spider pulsars; subsequent radio observations based on Fermi data have identified many. Fermi also has much wider sky coverage and is better at observing fast changes, such as pulsations, compared to traditional ground-based radio telescopes.

The Norwegian University of Science and Technology maintains a public online catalogue of known spider pulsars, called "SpiderCat". The SpiderCat catalogue was established by Karri Koljonen and Manuel Linares in 2025, and uses the three-criteria definition of spider pulsars from their 2025 study. As of March 2026, 122 spider pulsars are known according to SpiderCat, with 32 confirmed redbacks (RB), 31 redback candidates (RBc), 52 confirmed black widows (BW), four black widow candidates (BWc), two huntsmans (HM), and one huntsman candidate (HMc).

Spider pulsars are significant in observational astronomy because they are one of only a few types of binary pulsars for which a neutron star mass estimate can be obtained. This is because, unlike other types of pulsar binaries, their stellar companions are bright in optical wavelengths. This means that their radial velocities can be measured through optical spectroscopy. If both stars' radial velocities and the orbital inclination of the system are known, their individual masses can be estimated. Because the radial velocity of the neutron star can be found by measuring how frequently it pulses, if the inclination is known, the masses of both stars in spider pulsars can be found.

Knowing the mass of neutron stars is important because it allows certain neutron star equations of state to be ruled out. Equations of state (EoS) describe the interior of the neutron star, and different equations of state have different maximum mass limits. Finding a neutron star above an EoS's mass limit would rule out that EoS. Studying the extreme environment of neutron star interiors can give scientists substantial insights into nuclear physics.

== See also ==
- Pulsar planet
- Cataclysmic variable
