= 4U 0614+091 =

Binary star in the constellation Orion

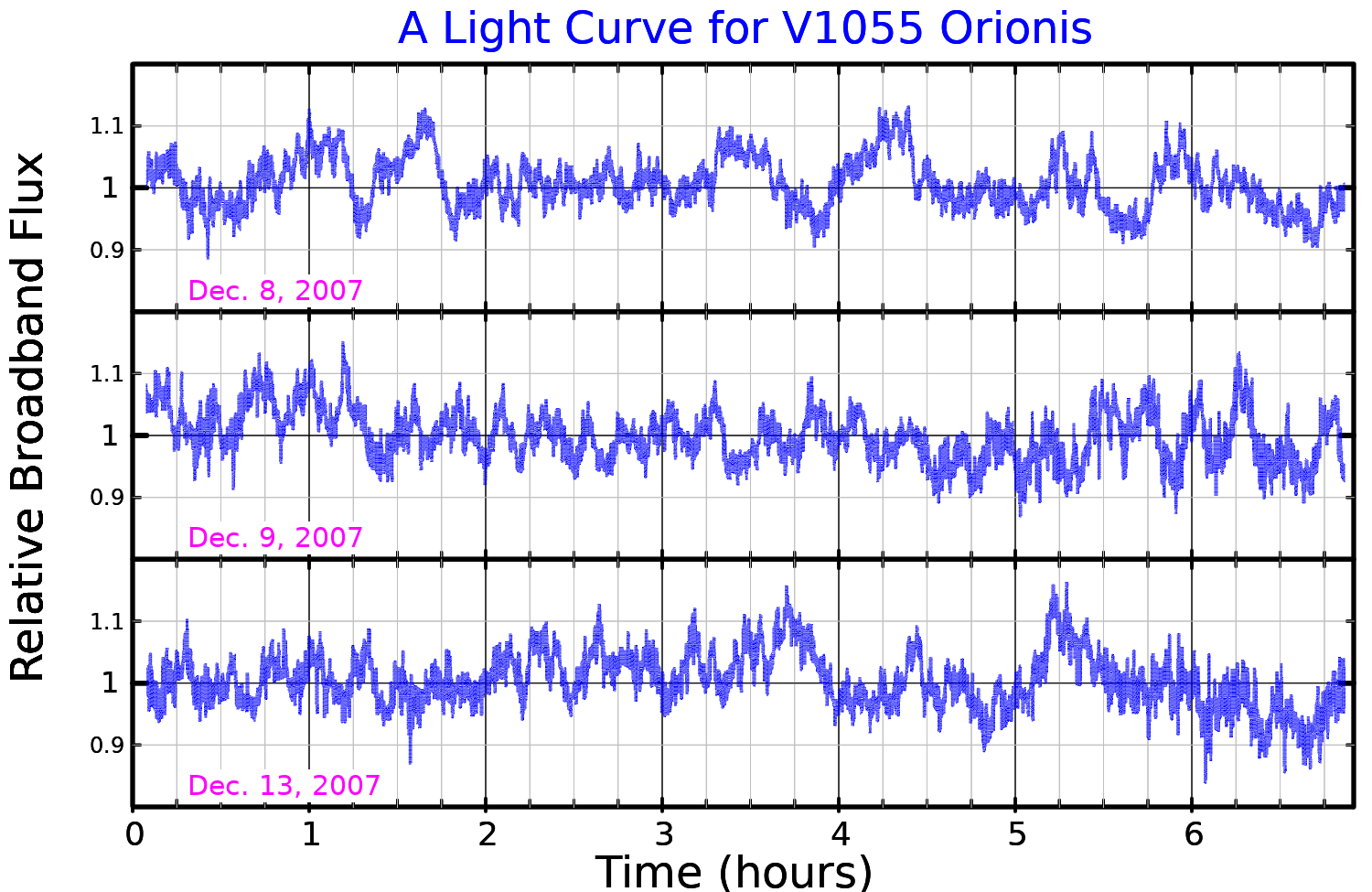
- A broadband optical light curve for V1055 Orionis, adapted from Zhang et al. (2012)

Observation data Epoch J2000.0 Equinox ICRS
- Constellation: Orion
- Right ascension: 06^{h} 17^{m} 07.3^{s}
- Declination: +09° 08′ 13″
- Apparent magnitude (V): 18.8

Characteristics
- U−B color index: 18.5
- B−V color index: 18.8

Astrometry
Proper motion (μ)	RA: 94.28084 mas/yr Dec.: +9.13667 mas/yr
Parallax (π)	6 mas
Distance	10,000 ly (3,000 pc)
Absolute magnitude (M_{V})	19.8

Other designations
- 1RXS J061707.4+090812, V1055 Ori

Database references
SIMBAD	data

4U 0614+091 is a low-mass X-ray binary star system which features a neutron star and a low-mass companion star. The binary system lies 10,000 light-years away in Orion. It produces jets like a microquasar, the first time an object other than a black hole has been shown to produce jets.

4U 0614+091 is an atoll source.
