= HM Cancri =

Binary star in the constellation Cancer

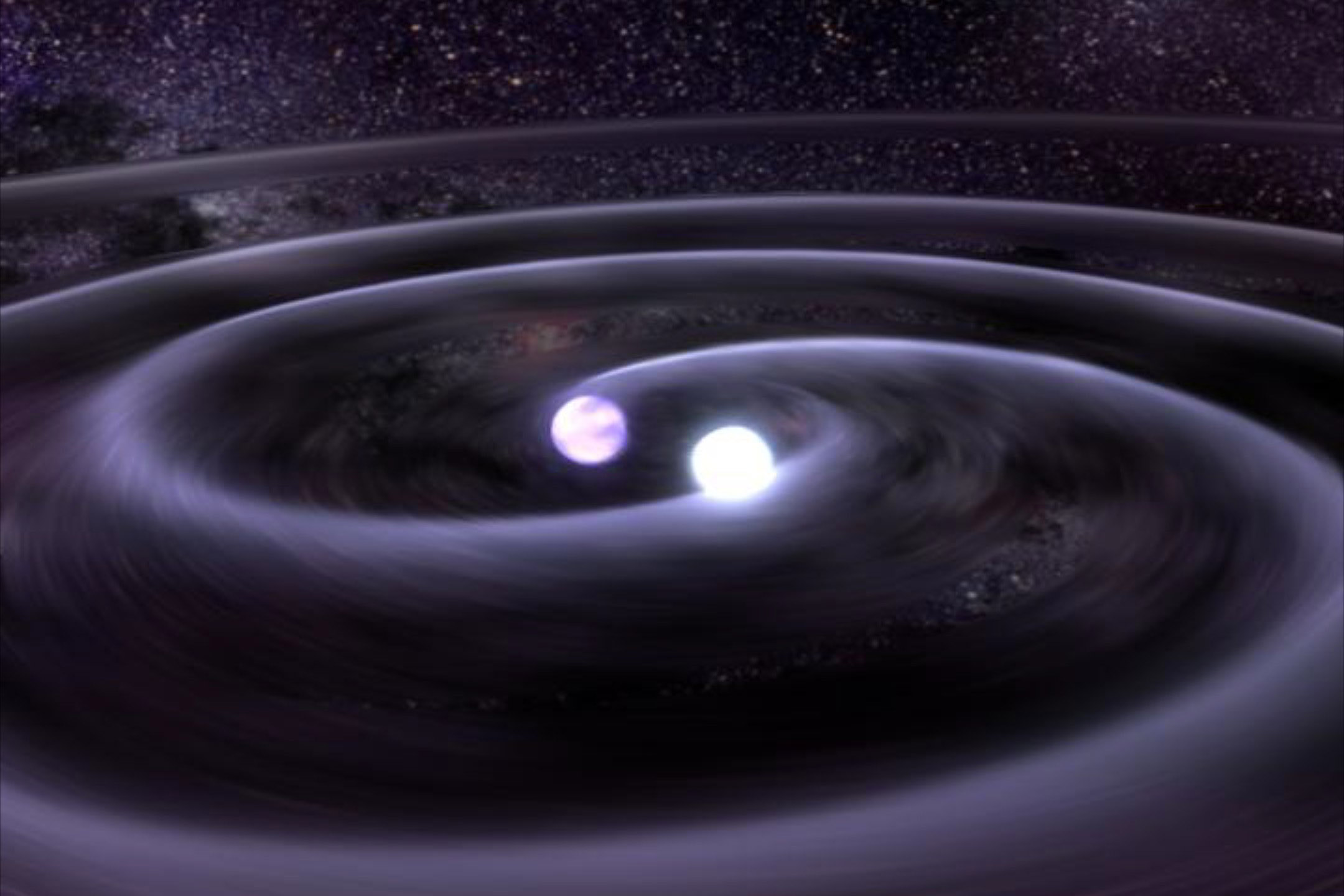
- An artist's depiction of J0806.

Observation data Epoch J2000 Equinox ICRS
- Constellation: Cancer
- Right ascension: 08^{h} 06^{m} 22.95196^{s}
- Declination: +15° 27′ 31.0073″
| Distance | 1,600 Light-years |

Binary orbit
| Period (P) | 321.5 seconds |
| dP/dt (Pdot) | 1.1 milliseconds per year |
- Separation: 0.0005 AU

Details
| Mass | 0.5 (primary) / 0.5 (b) M_{☉} |

Other designations
- RX J0806.3+1527, RX J0806, J0806, HM Cancri, HM Cnc

Database references
| SIMBAD | data |

HM Cancri (also known as HM Cnc or RX J0806.3+1527) is a binary star system about 1,600 light-years (490 pc; 1.5×10^{16} km) away. It comprises two dense white dwarfs orbiting each other once every 5.4 minutes, at an estimated distance of only 80,000 kilometres (50,000 miles) apart (about 1/5 the distance between the Earth and the Moon). The two stars orbit each other at speeds in excess of 400 kilometres per second (890,000 mph). The stars are estimated to be about half as massive as the Sun. Like typical white dwarfs, they are extremely dense, being composed of degenerate matter, and so have radii on the order of the Earth's radius. Astronomers believe that the two stars will eventually merge, based on data from many X-ray satellites, such as Chandra X-Ray Observatory, XMM-Newton and the Swift Gamma-Ray Burst Mission. These data show that the orbital period of the two stars is steadily decreasing at a rate of 1.2 milliseconds per year as they thus are getting closer by approximately 60 centimetres (2.0 ft) per day. At this rate, they can be expected to merge in approximately 340,000 years. With a revolution period of 5.4 minutes, HM Cancri is the shortest orbital period binary white dwarf system currently known.

== Observations ==
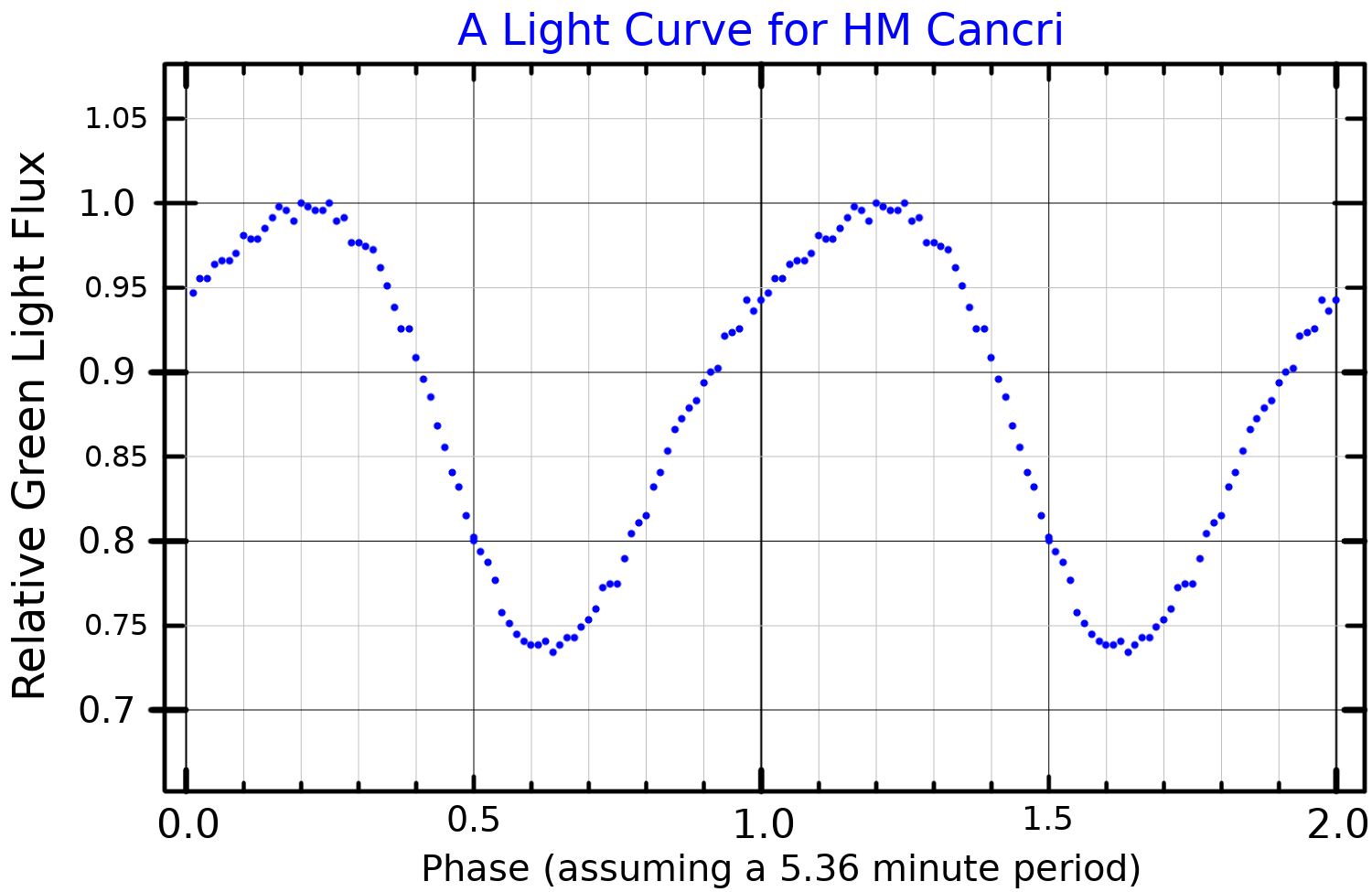
A green band light curve for HM Cancri, adapted from Barros et al. (2007)

As HM Cancri is a pair of white dwarfs, it has a relatively low optical luminosity. The 321.5 s modulation of HM Cancri was discovered serendipitously in 1999 thanks to the ROSAT mission working in the X-ray band. Optical follow-up observations with the ESO Very Large Telescope (VLT), Telescopio Nazionale Galileo (TNG) and Nordic Optical Telescope (NOT) allowed the counterpart to be identified, a relatively dim (20.7 magnitude in the B filter) object which shows an optical modulation at the same period detected in the X-ray band. The optical monitoring of the counterpart of HM Cancri during 2001-2004 clearly shows that the period is decreasing at a rate of about 1/1000 s each year. This result was confirmed by monitoring the source in the X-rays for several years.

== Relation to general relativity ==
The decreasing separation of the components of the system means that the system is losing orbital energy. Albert Einstein's theory of General Relativity predicts such a system will lose orbital energy through the generation of gravitational waves. Scientists believe that HM Cancri may be one of the strongest sources of gravitational waves in the Milky Way galaxy.

== Sources ==
- NASA Astronomy Picture of the Day: White Dwarf Star Spiral (1 June 2005)
- "Orbiting Stars Flooding Space with Gravitational Waves". Chandra X-Ray Observatory. May 30, 2005.
- RX J0806.3+1527: Orbiting Stars Flooding Space with Gravitational Waves
