= Millisecond radio pulsar =

Radio pulsar with a spin period under 20 ms

A millisecond radio pulsar (radio MSP, MSRP or MRP) is a type of millisecond pulsar—a pulsar with a rotational period less than 20 milliseconds—that emits radio waves. MSRPs are characterized by their lack of accretion, weak magnetic fields, and high fraction in binaries. They are also generally old systems of billions of years, and have the capacity to continue pulsing for billions more. MSRPs are the descendants of low-mass X-ray binaries, where accretion off of a low-mass star spins the pulsar up to millisecond-order periods.

== Formation ==
MSRPs are believed to be formed by the accretion of a large amount of mass from a donor in an X-ray binary system over a long period of time (~10^{7} years), spinning up the neutron star to extremely fast rates of rotation. This is known as the pulsar recycling scenario. The donor stars are expected to be low-mass (or potentially intermediate-mass), as a high-mass star would not allow for the pulsar to become fully recycled to millisecond periods. While the pulsar is still accreting but has reached the millisecond range of rotational periods, it is known as an accreting millisecond X-ray pulsar; AMXPs are believed to be progenitors of MSRPs.

== Properties ==
MSRPs have spin periods of ~1.4–20 milliseconds and most of them (≥70%) are in binaries, usually with a white dwarf. There are more isolated MSRPs in globular clusters, possibly due to dynamical interactions. Isolated MSRPs may also be created by the detachment of a binary system due to a supernova kick.

MSRPs have magnetic fields of 10^{7.5}–10^{9.5} G, much lower than typical radio pulsars, which have magnetic fields of ~10^{12} G. This is likely due to magnetic field decay over the lifespan of the pulsar, most of which is believed to occur while the pulsar is still accreting. They have wider opening angles of their radio beams and, contrary to their names, actually emit slightly less radio waves than ordinary pulsars. They show signatures of being generally old stars and have a relative velocity four times slower than ordinary pulsars.

== Dynamics ==
Most MSRPs do not accrete, and those that do, accrete very little. The boundary between MSRPs and accreting millisecond X-ray pulsars (AMXPs) is a mass accretion rate of 10^{−12}–10^{−11} M_{☉} per year. Because MSRPs are no longer accreting rapidly, they gradually spin down as their rotational energy is radiated away in the form of radio emission. Some spin-down also happens during the last phase of accretion, just before the pulsar becomes an MSRP.

== Evolution ==
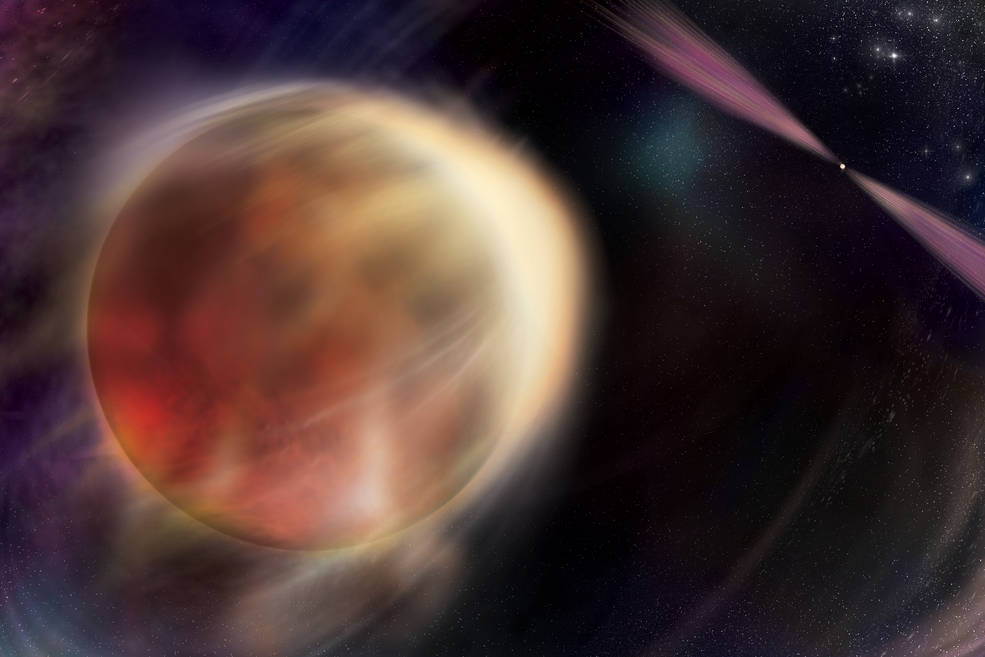
Black widow pulsars, like this one, can evolve from MSRPs

MSRPs may evolve into binary systems with a very-low-mass companion (0.01–0.05 M_{☉}) being ablated by the pulsar's wind. These are called very low mass binary pulsars (VLMBPs) and can be created when the orbit of a close binary containing an MSRP shrinks due to gravitational wave emission enough for accretion to restart, causing the pulsar to become recycled even more. About 40% of these are eclipsing binaries; such objects are known as black widow pulsars.

Over a long period of time, the MSRP will spin down until its rotational rate is too low to sustain the radio pulsation mechanism. The point at which this happens is known as the pulsar death line and the time it takes for the pulsar to reach this rate is inversely dependent on the strength of its magnetic field. Several observed MSRPs have very low spin-down rates; the lifetimes of these are comparable to the Hubble time.

== Observation ==
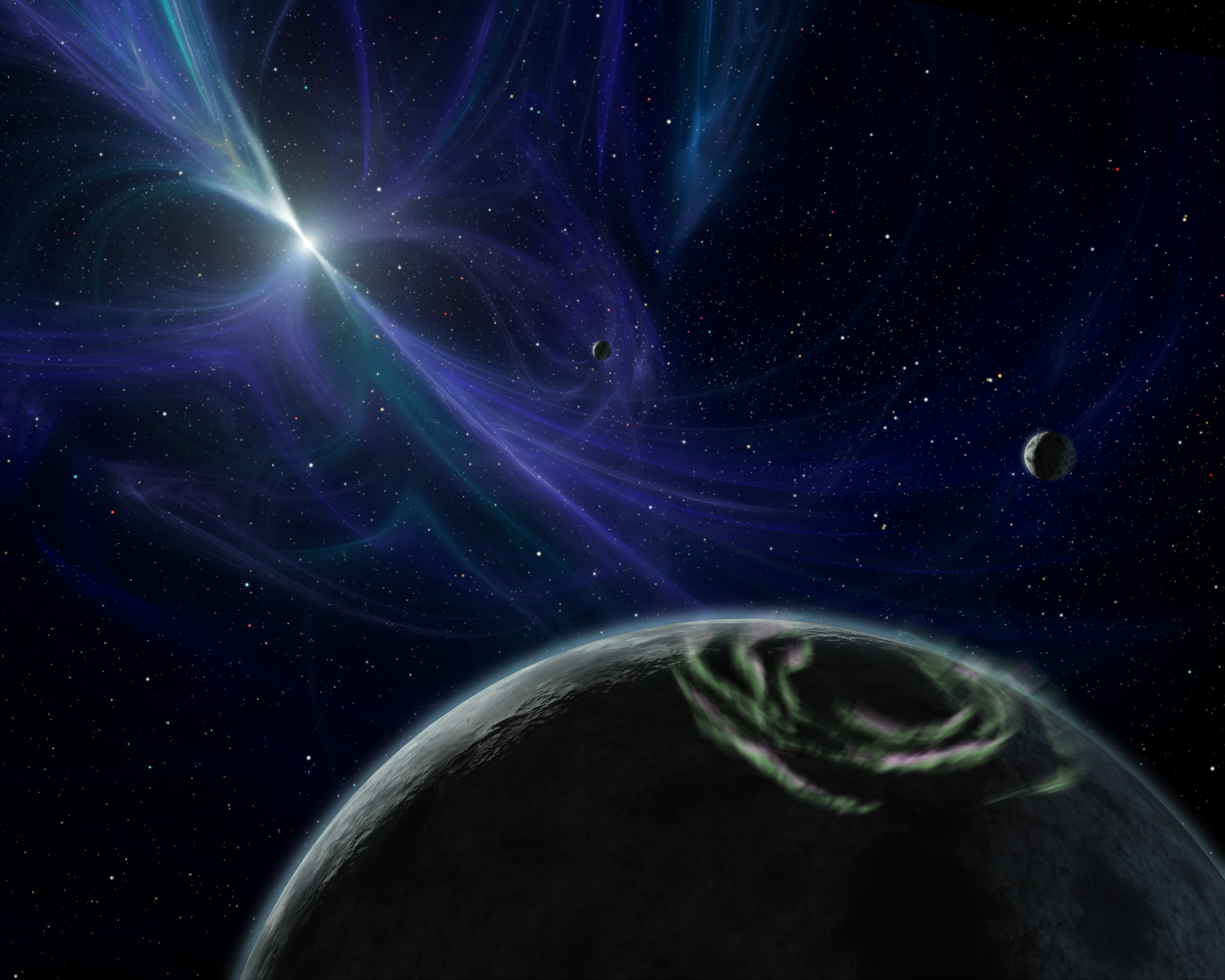
Artist's impression of PSR B1257+12's planetary system

The first-known MSRP, PSR B1937+12, was discovered at the Arecibo observatory in 1982. The first MSRP found in a globular cluster—in this case, Messier 28—was PSR B1821–24A, discovered at the Jodrell Bank observatory in 1987.

The first confirmed exoplanetary system was found around an MSRP, PSR B1257+12.
