= Low-mass X-ray binary =

Type of binary star

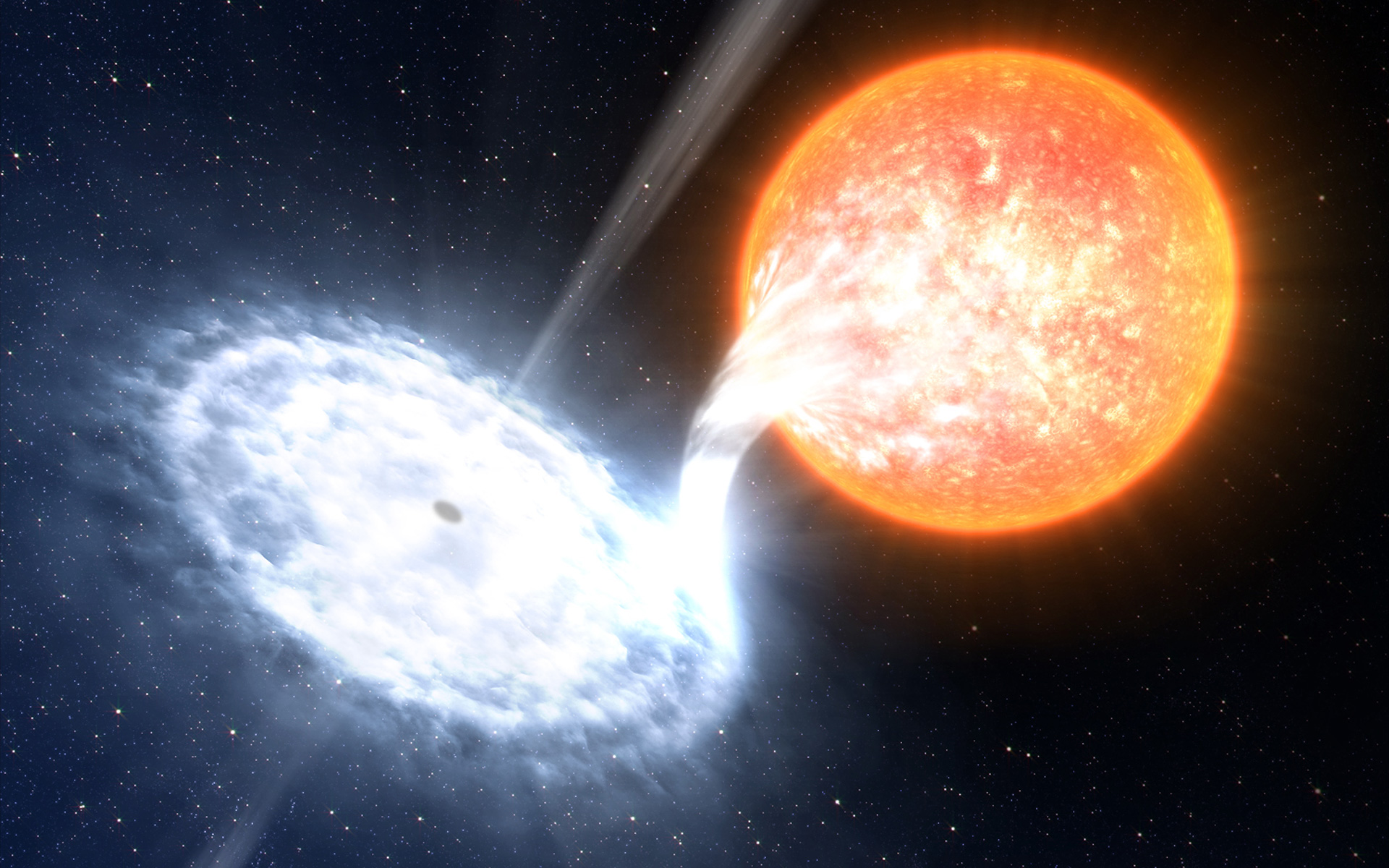
Artist's impression of a black hole LMXB

Low-mass X-ray binaries (LMXBs or LMXRBs) are X-ray binary systems containing a compact object, (Note: The terms primary object, compact object, and accretor all refer to the neutron star or black hole in the system.) typically a neutron star or black hole, and a star (Note: The terms secondary object, secondary star, donor star, and companion star all refer to the star.) less than or equal to the mass of the Sun. LMXBs form when a high-mass star in a binary system with a low-mass star explodes in a supernova, becoming a neutron star or black hole. When the low-mass star begins to evolve, or if the binary gets closer due to orbital decay, the low-mass star becomes unable to keep all of its gas bound to it and the compact object begins to pull matter off of it. Accretion from an LMXB produces bright X-ray emission that can be observed by astronomers.

Over 200 LMXBs have been discovered so far, both in the Milky Way and in other galaxies. LMXBs can be classified by their properties, such as orbital period, the type of compact object present, and luminosity variability. Some types of LMXBs are exclusive to neutron star binaries, while other types can host either a neutron star or a black hole.

The compact objects in LMXBs are expected to continue accreting from their companion stars until all that is left of the other star is its hydrogen or helium core. For small-enough stars, the loss of mass will be extreme enough that they will no longer be able to fuse hydrogen and will become brown dwarfs.

== Dynamics ==
LMXBs are binary systems containing a black hole or neutron star accreting gas from a companion star that is less than 1 solar mass (M_{☉}). During accretion, LMXBs generate large amounts of X-rays, shining brightly in high-energy light.

This is a schematic of a semidetached binary system with the larger component filling its Roche lobe (black line).

Accretion onto most LMXBs comes from Roche lobe overflow. A Roche lobe is a region around a star where matter is gravitationally bound to it. The secondary star will fill its Roche lobe, either due to stellar evolution, which causes the star to expand beyond its Roche lobe, or due to orbital decay, which causes the objects to get closer and the Roche lobe to shrink. When material from the star reaches the inner (L_{1}) Lagrange point of the binary, it is said to have filled its Roche lobe. Roche lobe overflow occurs when material from the star crosses this point and the gravitational pull of the compact object becomes stronger than the gravitational pull of the star. Mass from the secondary star will then flow towards the compact object through the Lagrange point. This phenomenon is known as accretion onto the compact object. It is also possible for accretion to take place without a star having filled its Roche lobe; for example, a compact object may accrete from material ejected from the secondary star by stellar winds.

Most LMXBs do not accrete continuously but instead go through periods of activity (outbursts) before settling back into quiescence; such LMXBs are called transients. Outbursts in transients generally lasts for weeks to months at a time, while quiescent periods of little-to-no accretion can last for months to decades. LMXBs that are not transients (are continuously accreting) are called persistent LMXBs. Persistent LMXBs may still vary in their accretion rate over time, but it is not as extreme as transient LMXBs. Quasi-persistent LMXBs are LMXBs that exhibit long outbursts (>1 year at a time) but still have periods of quiescence.

The secondary stars in LMXBs are mostly main-sequence stars. The main sequence is the main phase of life for a star in which it is fusing hydrogen into helium in its core. When the star runs out of hydrogen in its core, it will undergo further stages of stellar evolution. Evolved stars, such as subgiant stars, giant stars, and white dwarfs, can also be secondaries in LMXBs.

== Formation and evolution ==
Diagram of common envelope formation, the first stage of LMXB evolution. The black figure-eight represents the Roche lobes, the red object on the right (M_{1}) represents the more-massive star, the orange object on the left (M_{2}) represents the less-massive star, and CoM is the location of the binary's center of mass.

LMXB formation begins with a high-mass primary star (>10 M_{☉}) and a low-mass secondary star (<2 M_{☉}) in a close binary. When the primary evolves into a giant, it will expand and fill its Roche lobe, creating a common envelope of gas around the two stars and transferring mass to the smaller star. (Note: The primary star will always expand to fill its Roche lobe before the secondary does because more massive stars go through stellar evolution faster.) If the stars' orbital energy is too low, their orbit will decay and they will coalesce into a single star. However, if their orbital energy is high enough, they will spiral towards each other but not coalesce, ultimately settling into a shorter but stable orbit. Eventually, the primary star will become a neutron star or black hole through stellar evolution, losing mass in the process. Later, the secondary star will begin to expand due to stellar evolution or will get closer to the compact object through orbital decay and will fill its Roche lobe. At this point, the compact object will begin to accrete off of it, beginning a second phase of mass transfer.

=== In systems with M- and K- type secondaries ===
In LMXBs where the secondary star is an M- or K-type star–less than about 0.8 M_{☉}–the onset of accretion by the compact object cannot happen yet due to stellar evolution. This is because, in order for the secondary star to evolve enough to expand and fill its Roche lobe, it would have to be older than the age of the universe. Because stellar evolution is ruled out, sufficient orbital decay must happen in order for the star to fill its Roche lobe. This will first happen via magnetic braking, in which interactions between the secondary star's stellar wind and its magnetic field cause the orbital period of the binary to decrease. The compact object will begin accreting off of the star, and, to maintain stability, the star will swell in size. Eventually, however, the star will become fully convective, meaning that heat transfer in the star will be entirely caused by the bulk motion of plasma within the star. At this point, magnetic braking will cease, and the star will shrink, causing it to no longer fill its Roche lobe. Now, the system is a detached (non-mass-transferring) binary with an orbital period of about 3 hours. The orbit of the two objects will continue to decay due to gravitational radiation (gravitational wave emission), albeit significantly slower than before, until the secondary star fills its Roche lobe again. The compact object will once again accrete matter from the secondary star, which will eventually lose enough mass to be unable to sustain hydrogen fusion and therefore become a brown dwarf. Once the secondary is a brown dwarf, it will expand in response to mass loss, causing the orbital period to increase again.

=== In systems with G-, F-, A-, and late B-type secondaries ===
In LMXBs where the secondary star is a main-sequence star more massive than K-type (stars of spectral class G or earlier), stellar evolution of the secondary star will generally influence the evolution of the system.

In a radiative common envelope, heat transfer within the envelope occurs primarily through the emission and absorption of photons. For systems with radiative common envelopes, the second phase of mass transfer is triggered only by stellar evolution of the secondary star. When stable mass transfer begins, the orbital period of the binary will increase in response to mass loss from the secondary star.

For stars with convective common envelopes, the second phase of mass transfer is triggered by both magnetic braking and stellar evolution. When stable mass transfer begins, these binaries can evolve in one of two ways. If the main contributor to Roche lobe overflow is the secondary star's stellar evolution, the orbital period of the binary will increase with mass loss. Conversely, if the dominant factor is magnetic braking, the binary's orbit will decay with mass loss. These two paths are known as divergent and convergent evolution, respectively. (Note: These are unrelated to the topic of divergent and convergent evolution in biology.) In convergent systems, if the secondary star has enough time to evolve a degenerate helium core, the system will end up as a ultracompact X-ray binary (UCXB) with a very short orbital period and a helium-rich degenerate secondary star. Otherwise, the system will evolve into an LMXB with a hydrogen-rich degenerate secondary star.

In cases where the secondary star is more massive than the compact object, mass transfer may initially be thermally unstable—the rate at which the star produces heat energy and the rate at which it releases that energy by radiating it away is imbalanced. However, eventually, mass transfer will stabilize and thermal equilibrium will be restored.

== Properties ==
Unlike high-mass X-ray binaries (HMXBs), the spectra of LMXBs lack typical stellar absorption lines in their spectra. This is believed to be because the total emission from the system is dominated by light from the accretion disk of the compact object rather than light from the donor star. This makes spectral features of the donor star far less visible.

The inherent luminosity of an LMXB scales with its mass accretion rate. However, the apparent (observed) luminosity of an intrinsically-bright LMXB may be low because the source is occulted. This happens more often in systems with a high orbital inclination or strong accretion disk wind because the most luminous part of the LMXB is obscured. X-ray emission is particularly strong in the inner accretion disk region.

=== Orbital periods ===
LMXB orbital periods are generally short compared to the orbital periods of other types of binary stars, typically less than 1 day. When the companion star is a main-sequence star, LMXB orbital periods are typically on the order of hours, while for LMXBs with giant companions, orbits can last days to weeks. Additionally, LMXBs with the lowest accretion rates tend to have shorter orbital periods than LMXBs with near-Eddington (very high) accretion rates, particularly in black hole systems. It is likely that many of these near-Eddington LMXBs host a giant donor star.

Confirmed black hole (BH) LMXBs all have orbital periods ranging from hours to weeks, with few having periods less than 4 hours or greater than 1 week. Neutron star (NS) LMXBs have much wider variation in orbital duration, with periods of confirmed NS LMXBs ranging from 11 minutes to 3.1 years.

=== Distribution ===
LMXBs are usually billions of years old and are sometimes associated with regions of older star populations, such as globular clusters or the Galactic Center. Older NS LMXBs tend to have lower NS magnetic fields, as most of the NS's original magnetic field has dissipated since forming; these LMXBs typically have magnetic field strengths to the order of 10^{8}–10^{10} Gauss.

When the primary object in an LMXB undergoes a supernova, it can generate a significant velocity kick to the system, resulting in many observed LMXBs moving at atypically fast speeds relative to Earth or located far from their original position in the galaxy. These kicks are generally larger for NS LMXBs than for BH LMXBs.

A disproportionately large number of LMXBs have been observed in globular clusters. This has led some academics to speculate that interactions between stars in the globular cluster leads to the formation of LMXBs, such as gravitational capture of the compact object by the companion star. Because of this, some academics have suggested that LMXBs originally start out in globular clusters before spreading out throughout the galaxy. However, very few BH LMXBs are in globular clusters and this hypothesis does not explain the observed abundance and distribution of BH LMXBs.

== Subtypes ==
=== Neutron star LMXBs ===
NS LMXBs primarily generate energy through the release of gravitational potential energy, converting about 10% of the accreted material's rest mass-energy into light, mostly in X-rays.

NS LMXBs can sometimes exhibit a very fast type of luminosity variation known as kilohertz quasi-periodic oscillations (QPOs). At 200–1300 Hertz, depending on the state of the NS, these QPOs are the fastest variability observed from any astronomical object.

==== Accreting millisecond X-ray pulsars ====
Animation of a pulsar being spun-up by accretion

About one fifth of discovered neutron star LMXBs can be classified as accreting millisecond X-ray pulsars (AMXPs), sometimes called accreting millisecond pulsars (AMSPs). All known AMXPs are transients, and tend to emit in hard (high-energy) X-rays during their outbursts. The accretion flow in these systems is shaped by the neutron star's magnetic field, pulling material towards the neutron star's magnetic poles. This phenomenon increases the spin rate of the neutron star and generates X-ray pulsations every 1–10 milliseconds as the pulsar rotates. Companion stars that have been observed in AMXPs include brown dwarfs, white dwarfs, helium stars, and main-sequence stars. AMXPs are believed to be the progenitors of millisecond radio pulsars.

==== Z sources ====
Z sources are persistent NS LMXBs with high accretion rates near the Eddington limit (theoretical maximum). They trace a Z-shape when their luminosity is plotted on an X-ray color-color diagram. Jets have been observed in Z sources. The three branches of the Z are called the horizontal branch, normal branch, and flaring branch. A Z source moves along the Z-track over periods of hours to days.

==== Atoll sources ====
Atoll sources are NS LMXBs with accretion rates that are relatively low compared to the Eddington limit. They can be persistent or transient. Atoll sources move between two states, the banana state (Note: The banana state can also sometimes be further divided into the upper banana state and the lower banana state.) and the island state, named after their shapes on an X-ray color-color diagram. Atoll sources spend much longer than Z sources moving along the color-color diagram, on the order of days to weeks, spending most of that time in the island state. They are also generally dimmer than Z sources in both X-ray and radio wavelengths. A subclass of atoll sources, bright atolls, are persistent LMXBs and are almost always in the banana state. Jets have been observed in some atoll sources.

=== Black hole LMXBs ===
Although many BH LMXBs have been observed, they are outnumbered by NS LMXBs by a factor of approximately 2:1. This aligns with the initial mass function, which predicts much higher rates of neutron star formation than black hole formation. Like NS LMXBs, many BH LMXBs have been observed to have jets. These jets are emitted in the hard (high-energy) X-ray state, and then are extinguished in the soft (low-energy) X-ray state, when the accretion rate is low.

=== Ultracompact X-ray binaries ===
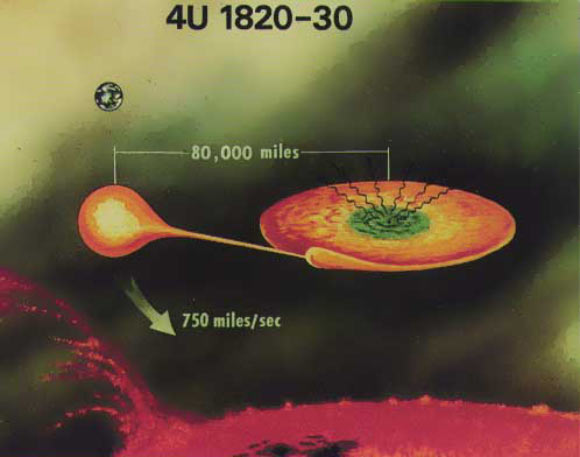
Diagram of the orbit of 4U 1820–30, a UCXB with an 11-minute orbital period.

Ultracompact X-ray binaries (UCXBs) are LMXBs with very short orbital periods of approximately 80 minutes or less. They can contain either a NS or BH accretor; however, most discovered UCXBs in the galaxy contain a NS rather than a BH. Only white dwarfs and helium-fusing subgiant stars are small enough to be the secondary star for these orbital periods. UCXBs can be detected from periodic changes in the system associated with orbital motion. If the LMXB is also an AMXP, the rate of pulsations can also be used, as it is correlated with the system's orbital period. Unlike most other LMXB types, UCXBs are generally persistent. Their elemental composition is largely helium, carbon, oxygen, and neon, with very low abundances of hydrogen. UCXBs are believed to be major sources of gravitational waves; unlike other types of LMXBs, where orbital decay is often driven by magnetic braking, orbital decay in UCXBs is caused mainly by gravitational radiation.

=== Symbiotic X-ray binaries ===
Unlike other classes of LMXBs, symbiotic X-ray binaries (SyXBs) do not experience Roche lobe overflow. Rather, the primary object accretes stellar wind ejected from the secondary, a cool giant star. Most SyXBs show significant variability, shifting between outburst and quiescent phases on timescales of hours or days. (Note: The only identified persistent SyXB is GX 1+4.) However, their emission patterns are very sporadic, making them frequently difficult to detect and classify. As of 2024, neutron stars have been identified as the primary object in several SyXBs, but no black hole SyXBs have been identified. However, black holes have not been ruled out as primary objects in SyXBs, and the nature of the compact object in many SyXBs is unknown.

=== Soft X-ray transients ===
Artist's impression of soft X-ray transient GRO J1655–40.

Soft X-ray transients (SXTs) are a type of LMXB transients that spend most of their time in quiescence, but exhibit occasional flares with luminosities peaking around 3–200 kiloelectronvolts. Most known SXTs are black hole binaries. When SXTs flare, they are most luminous in soft X-rays generated by thermal blackbody emission. SXTs with longer orbital periods have brighter flares. Accretion rates in NS SXTs and BH SXTs are similar.

=== Supersoft X-ray sources ===
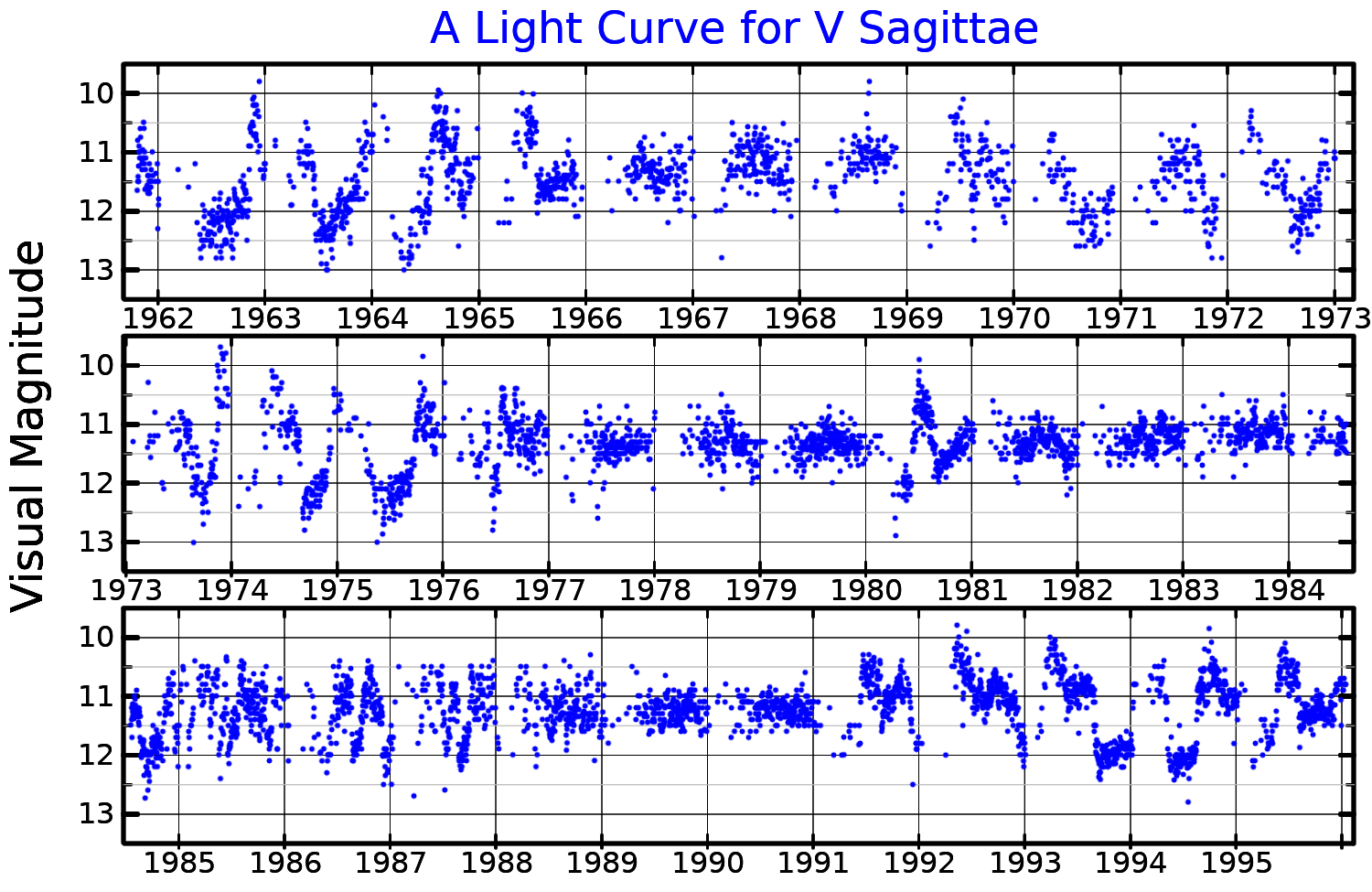
Microwave light curve for supersoft X-ray source V Sagittae

Supersoft X-ray sources (SSSs or SSXSs), also known as supersoft x-ray binaries, are X-ray sources emitting soft X-rays at very high luminosities. Believed to contain a white dwarf accreting off of a low-mass star, SSXSs do not fit with traditional properties of either cataclysmic variables or LMXBs. Therefore, although SSXSs are binaries and are emitting largely in X-rays, they are not classified as LMXBs by some definitions, particularly those requiring that the accreting object in an LMXB be a neutron star or black hole. It is possible, however, that some SSXSs may actually contain neutron stars, or even black holes.

== Observation ==
As of 2024, around 200 confirmed and candidate LMXBs have been discovered in the Milky Way. When LMXBs are actively accreting, they become some of the brightest X-ray point sources in the sky, allowing for their discovery and identification. Due to advances in telescope technology, transient LMXBs are being discovered increasingly quickly.

During accretion, the spectrum emitted by an LMXB is overwhelmed by emission from the accretion disk of the NS or BH, even at low-frequency wavelengths. This makes it difficult to study the properties of the companion star. Although transient LMXBs can be studied during quiescence, when accretion disk emission is low enough to discern the spectrum of the donor star, this poses a problem for persistent LMXBs, which never have optimal periods to study the companion star.

Observation of the compact object during quiescence can also provide scientific insight. For example, studying blackbody radiation emitted from NSs in LMXBs can constrain the possible properties of NSs.

=== Differentiating NS and BH LMXBs ===
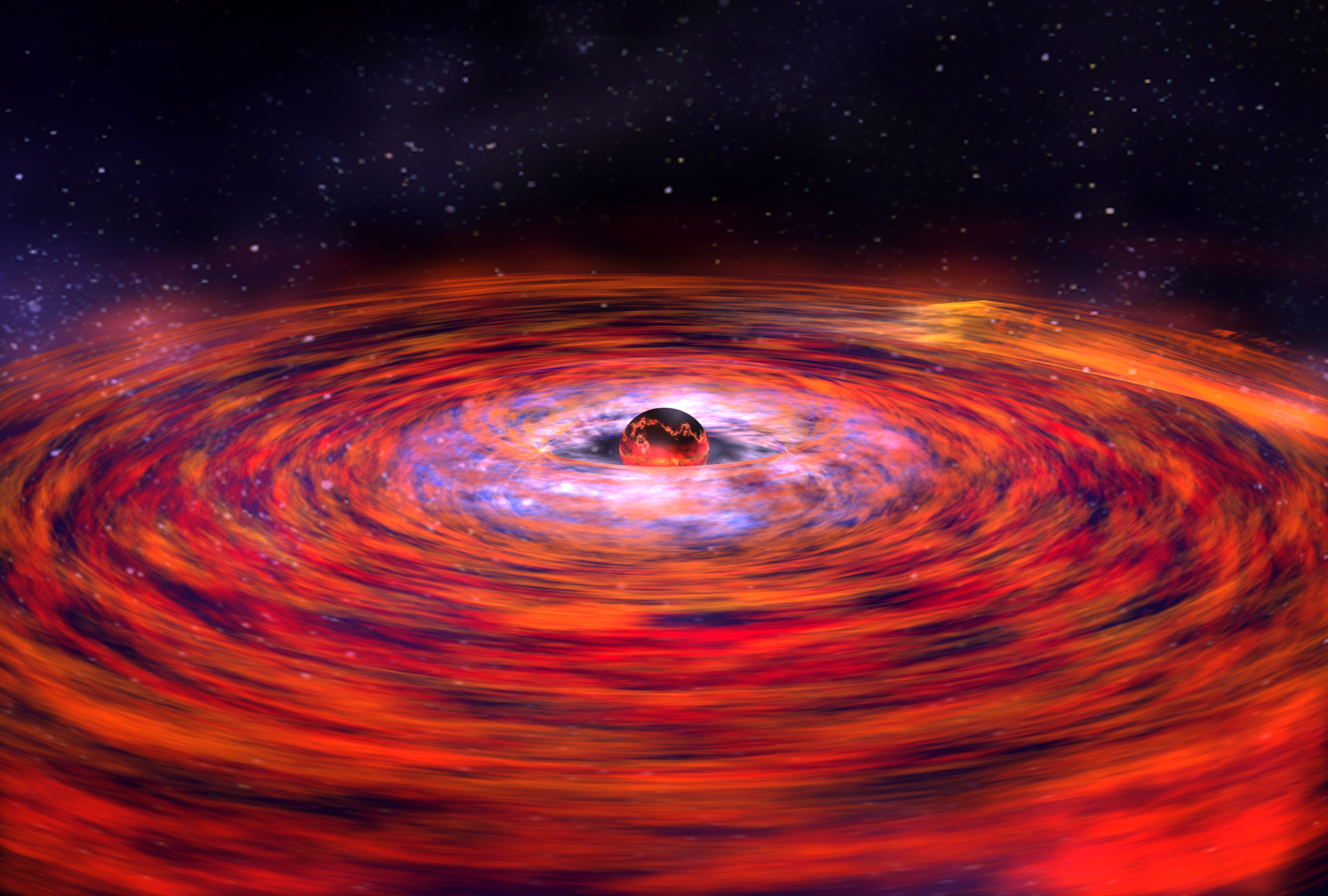
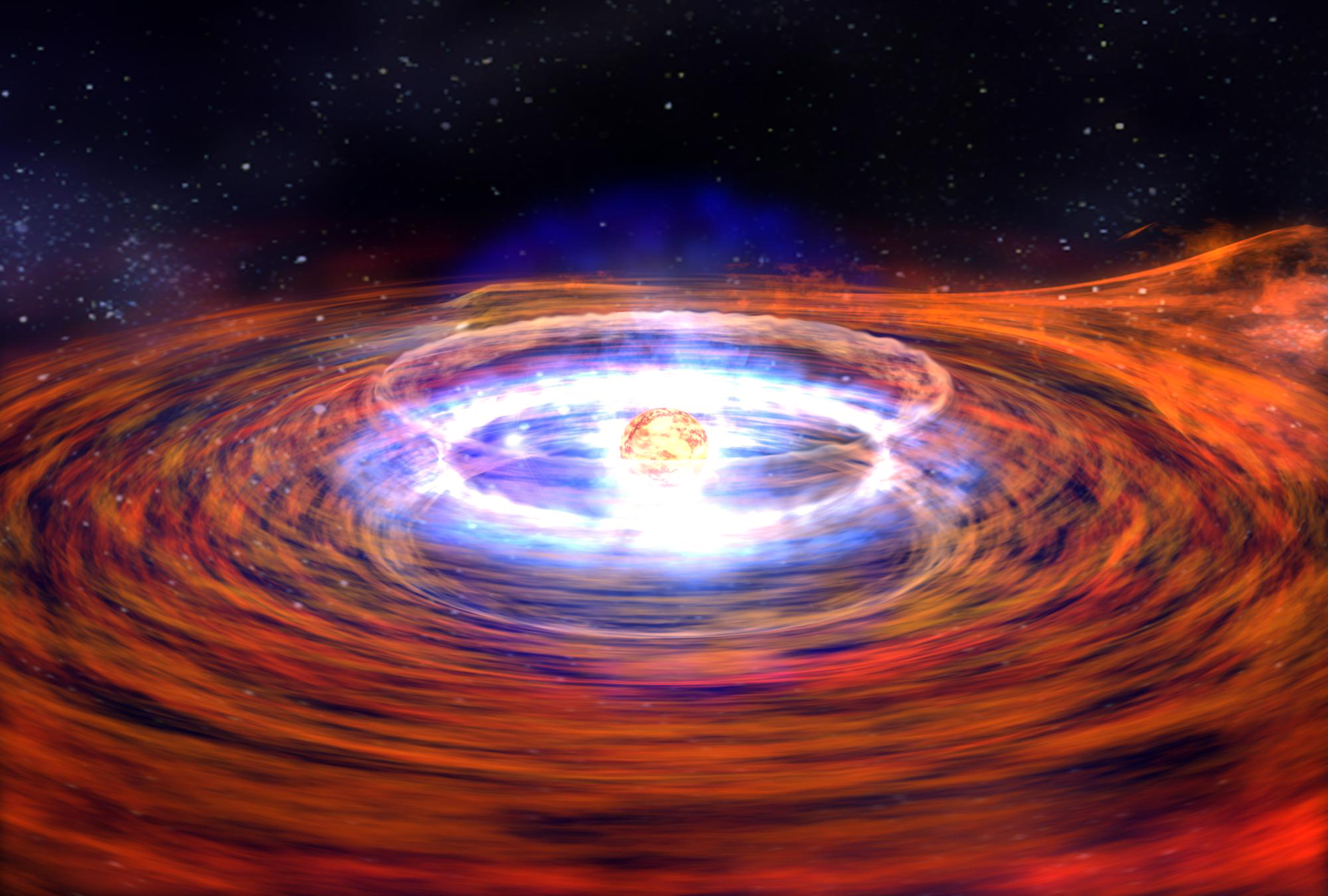
LMXB before an X-ray burst (left) and during an X-ray burst (right)

The presence of a neutron star in an LMXB can be confirmed by identifying events that require a solid surface, which a black hole does not have. For example, observations of type I X-ray bursts can confirm a system has a neutron star, as they arise from thermonuclear fusion of accreted matter on the star's surface. These bursts are very energetic, emitting 10^{39} ergs of energy over just a few seconds. (Note: For comparison, the Sun takes more than a week to release an equivalent amount of energy.) X-ray pulsations can also confirm that an LMXB contains a neutron star, since they occur due to hotspots on the surface of the star. However, not all NS LMXBs exhibit pulsations or bursts, so the presence of one should not be ruled out if these phenomena are not detected. In fact, identifying the compact object in LMXBs with very low luminosities can be a challenge because pulses and bursts tend to be absent or undetectable, even if the system contains an NS.

NS and BH LMXBs can also be differentiated by emission from their jets. Both NS and BH LMXBs can have jets, but for similar accretion rates, BH LMXBs have much more radio emission from jets than NS LMXBs, typically by a factor of 5–20. However, levels of radio emission can overlap, so LMXBs with high radio emission can host NSs, and LMXBs with low radio emission can contain BHs.

Blackbody emission in X-rays from quiescent LMXBs can confirm that the system contains a neutron star. Blackbody radiation is electromagnetic radiation emitted by a hot object and its spectrum changes with temperature. The surface of a NS is typically around 10^{6} Kelvin, which is high enough for its blackbody spectrum to peak in soft X-rays and be easily distinguishable from the spectrum of a companion star with a much cooler surface. However, this method is only applicable to transients, and extinction can prevent the observation of soft X-ray radiation. Additionally, a sufficiently cool neutron star may peak at lower energies. Thus, the lack of an observed NS blackbody spectrum cannot rule out the presence of a NS in an LMXB.

Estimation of the mass of the compact object can directly differentiate NS and BH LMXBs, as NSs >3 M_{☉} would be unable to support themselves via neutron degeneracy pressure and would collapse into black holes. Mass estimates typically rely on radial velocity spectroscopy, which measures the shifts in the spectrum of the visible companion star as it moves in orbit with the compact object. However, the angle of inclination of the binary's orbit with respect to Earth is needed to accurately pinpoint the mass of the compact object, and this angle is often difficult to determine observationally. However, even with an unknown angle of inclination, a lower limit on the mass of the compact object can be placed based on radial velocity alone; if this mass is greater than 3 M_{☉}, the compact object in the system can be confidently identified as a black hole.

== See also ==
- Intermediate-mass X-ray binary
- High-mass X-ray binary
- Blue straggler – Abnormally hot and luminous stars in a globular cluster that may be the result of binary interactions of LMXBs or their progenitors
- X-ray pulsar – A type of neutron star X-ray binary that is more commonly high-mass, but can also be low-mass
- Variable star – LMXBs are a subtype of this category of stars that exhibit varying electromagnetic emission
- Stellar vampirism – A broader phenomenon of mass transfer between binary stars
