= History of X-ray astronomy =

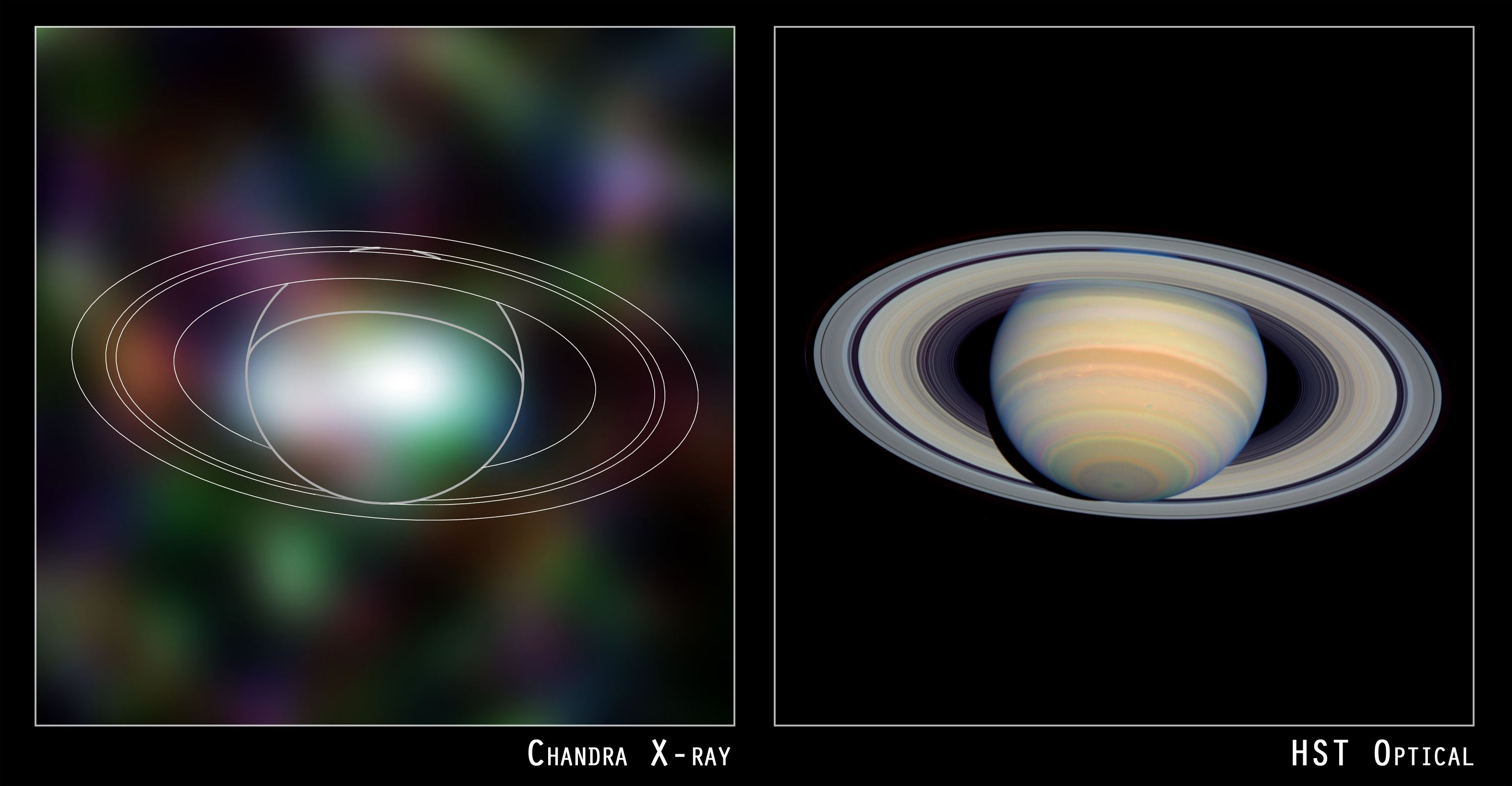
Chandra's image of Saturn (left) and Hubble optical image of Saturn (right). Saturn's X-ray spectrum is similar to that of X-rays from the Sun. 14 April 2003

The history of X-ray astronomy begins in the 1920s, with interest in short wave communications for the U.S. Navy. This was soon followed by extensive study of the earth's ionosphere. By 1927, interest in the detection of X-ray and ultraviolet (UV) radiation at high altitudes inspired researchers to launch Goddard's rockets into the upper atmosphere to support theoretical studies and data gathering. The first successful rocket flight equipped with instrumentation able to detect solar ultraviolet radiation occurred in 1946. X-ray solar studies began in 1949. By 1973 a solar instrument package orbited on Skylab providing significant solar data.

In 1965 the Goddard Space Flight Center program in X-ray astronomy was initiated with a series of balloon-borne experiments. In the 1970s this was followed by high altitude sounding rocket experiments, and that was followed by orbiting (satellite) observatories.

The first rocket flight to successfully detect a cosmic source of X-ray emission was launched in 1962 by a group at American Science and Engineering (AS&E).

X-ray wavelengths reveal information about the bodies (sources) that emit them.

== 1920s to the 1940s ==
The Naval Research Laboratory (NRL) opened in 1923. After E.O. Hulburt (1890–1982) arrived there in 1924 he studied physical optics. The NRL was conducting research on the properties of the ionosphere (Earth's reflecting layer) because of interest in short wave radio communications. Hubert (Hulburt ?) produced a series of mathematical descriptions of the ionosphere during the 1920s and 1930s. In 1927, at the Carnegie Institution of Washington, Hulburt, Gregory Breit and Merle Tuve explored the possibility of equipping Robert Goddard's rockets to explore the upper atmosphere. In 1929 Hulburt proposed an experimental program in which a rocket might be instrumented to explore the upper atmosphere. This proposal included detection of ultraviolet radiation and X rays at high altitudes.

Herbert Friedman began X-ray solar studies in 1949 and soon reported that the energy of "the solar X-ray spectrum ... is adequate to account for all of E-layer ionization." Thus one of Hulburt's original questions, the source and behavior of the radio-reflecting layer, began to find its answer in space research.

At the end of the 1930s other studies included the inference of an X-ray corona by optical methods and, in 1949, more direct evidence by detecting X-ray photons.

Because the Earth's atmosphere blocks X-rays at ground level, Wilhelm Röntgen's discovery had no effect on observational astronomy for the first 50 years. X-ray astronomy became possible only with the capability to use rockets that far exceeded the altitudes of balloons. In 1948 U.S. researchers used a German-made V-2 rocket to gather the first records of solar x-rays.

The NRL has placed instruments in rockets, satellites, Skylab, and Spacelab 2.

Through the 1960s, 70s, 80s, and 90s, the sensitivity of detectors increased greatly during the 60 years of X-ray astronomy. In addition, the ability to focus X-rays has developed enormously—allowing the production of high-quality images.

== 1960s ==
The study of astronomical objects at the highest energies of X-rays and gamma rays began in the early 1960s. Before then, scientists knew only that the Sun was an intense source in these wavebands. Earth's atmosphere absorbs most X-rays and gamma rays, so rocket flights that could lift scientific payloads above Earth's atmosphere were needed. The first rocket flight to successfully detect a cosmic source of X-ray emission was launched in 1962 by a group at American Science and Engineering (AS&E). The team of scientists on this project included Riccardo Giacconi, Herbert Gursky, Frank Paolini, and Bruno Rossi. They used a small X-ray detector on board a rocket flight, with which they found a very bright source in the constellation of Scorpius. Hence, this source was later named Scorpius X-1.

== 1970s ==
In the 1970s, dedicated X-ray astronomy satellites, such as Uhuru, Ariel 5, SAS-3, OSO-8 and HEAO-1, developed this field of science at an astounding pace. Scientists hypothesized that X-rays from stellar sources in our galaxy were primarily from a neutron star in a binary system with a normal star. In these "X-ray binaries," the X-rays originate from material traveling from the normal star to the neutron star in a process called accretion. The binary nature of the system allowed astronomers to measure the mass of the neutron star. For other systems, the inferred mass of the X-ray emitting object supported the idea of the existence of black holes, as they were too massive to be neutron stars. Other systems displayed a characteristic X-ray pulse, just as pulsars had been found to do in the radio regime, which allowed a determination of the spin rate of the neutron star.

Finally, some of these galactic X-ray sources were found to be highly variable. In fact, some sources would appear in the sky, remain bright for a few weeks, and then fade again from view. Such sources are called X-ray transients. The inner regions of some galaxies were also found to emit X-rays. The X-ray emission from these active galactic nuclei is believed to originate from ultra-relativistic gas near a very massive black hole at the galaxy's center. Lastly, a diffuse X-ray emission was found to exist all over the sky.

== 1980s to the present ==
The study of X-ray astronomy continued to be carried out using data from a host of satellites that were active from the 1980s to the early 2000s: the HEAO Program, EXOSAT, Ginga, RXTE, ROSAT, ASCA, as well as BeppoSAX, which detected the first afterglow of a gamma-ray burst (GRB). Data from these satellites continues to aid our further understanding of the nature of these sources and the mechanisms by which the X-rays and gamma rays are emitted. Understanding these mechanisms can in turn shed light on the fundamental physics of our universe. By looking at the sky with X-ray and gamma-ray instruments, we collect important information in our attempt to address questions such as how the universe began and how it evolves, and gain some insight into its eventual fate.

== Goddard Space Flight Center ==
=== Balloons ===
In 1965, at the suggestion of Frank McDonald, Elihu Boldt initiated Goddard's program in X-ray astronomy with a series of balloon-borne experiments. At an early stage he was joined by Peter Serlemitsos, who had just completed his PhD space physics thesis on magnetospheric electrons, and by Guenter Riegler, a University of Maryland physics graduate student interested in doing his dissertation research in astrophysics.

From 1965 to 1972 there were over a dozen balloon-borne experiments (mostly from New Mexico), including the first such to take place from Australia (1966), one in which hard X-ray emission was discovered (albeit with crude angular resolution) from a region towards the Galactic Center whose centroid is located among subsequently identified sources GX1+4, GX3+1, and GX5-1.

Due to the attenuation of soft X-rays by the residual atmosphere at balloon altitudes these early experiments were restricted to energies above ~20 keV. Observations down to lower energies were begun with a series of high altitude sounding rocket experiments; by this stage Steve Holt had already joined the program. A 1972 rocket-borne observation of Cas A, the youngest supernova remnant in our galaxy, yielded the first detection of an X-ray spectral line, iron K-line emission at ~7 keV.

=== Rockets ===
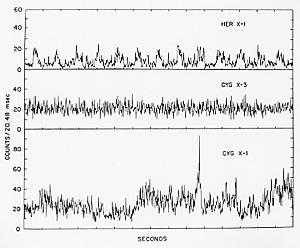
Graph

The figure to the right shows 15-second samples of the raw counts (per 20.48ms) observed in a 1973 sounding-rocket-borne exposure to three of the X-ray brightest binary sources in the Milky Way Galaxy: Her X-1 (1.7 days), Cyg X-3 (0.2 day), and Cyg X-1 (5.6 days). The 1.24 second pulsar period associated with Her X-1 is immediately evident from the data, while the rate profile for Cyg X-3 is completely consistent with the statistical fluctuations in counts expected for a source that is constant, at least for the 15s duration of the exposure shown. The Cyg X-1 data, on the other hand, clearly exhibit the chaotic "shot noise" behavior characteristic of this black-hole candidate and also provided preliminary evidence for the additional feature of millisecond "burst" sub-structure, noted for the first time in this observation. The sharp cut-off at ~24 keV in the flat spectrum observed for Her X-1 in this exposure provided the first reported evidence for radiative transfer effects to be associated with a highly magnetized plasma near the surface of a neutron star. The black-body spectral component observed for Cyg X-3 during this experiment gave strong evidence that this emission is from the immediate vicinity of a compact object the size of a neutron star.

An observation of Cyg X-3 a year later with the same instrument yielded an optically thin thermal spectrum for this source and provided the first evidence for strong spectral iron K-line emission from an X-ray binary.

=== Orbiting observatories ===
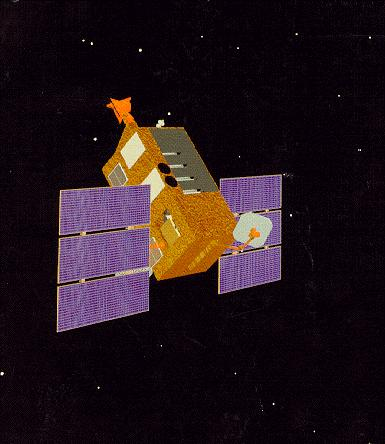
The Rossi X-ray Timing Explorer (RXTE) is a satellite that observes the time structure of astronomical X-ray sources. The RXTE has three instruments—the Proportional Counter Array, the High-Energy X-ray Timing Experiment (HEXTE), and one instrument called the All Sky Monitor. The RXTE observes X-rays from black holes, neutron stars, X-ray pulsars and x-ray bursts.

Our large area PCA (Proportional Counter Array) on the current RXTE (Rossi X-ray Timing Explorer) mission genuinely reflects the heritage of our sounding rocket program. RXTE continues to provide very valuable data as it enters the second decade of successful operation. Goddard's ASM (All-Sky Monitor) pin-hole X-ray camera on Ariel-5 (1974-1980) was the first X-ray astronomy experiment to use imaging proportional counters (albeit one-dimensional); it provided information on transient sources and the long-term behavior of several bright objects. Jean Swank joined the program in time for the beginning of our OSO-8 experiment (1975-1978), the first broadband (2-40 keV) orbiting observatory based on multi-anode multi-layer proportional chambers, one that showed the power of X-ray spectroscopy; for example, it established that iron K-line emission is a ubiquitous feature of clusters of galaxies.

The HEAO-1 A2 full-sky cosmic X-ray experiment (1977-1979) provided the most comprehensive data (still the most definitive) on the cosmic X-ray background broadband spectrum and large-scale structure, and a much used complete sample of the brightest extragalactic sources; it posed the challenging "spectral paradox" just now being unraveled with new results on evolution (from deep surveys) and on individual source spectra extending into the gamma-ray band. The SSS (Solid State Spectrometer) at the focus of the HEAO-2 Einstein Observatory (1978-1981) grazing incidence telescope was the first high spectral resolution non-dispersive spectrometer to be used for X-ray astronomy, here for energies up to ~3 keV, limited by the telescope optics.

By the use of conical foil optics, developed in our lab, the response of a grazing incidence X-ray telescope was extended to 12 keV, amply covering the crucial iron K-band of emission. A cooled Si(Li) solid state detector was used at the focus of such a telescope for the BBXRT (Broad Band X-Ray Telescope) on the Astro-1 shuttle mission (STS-35) on Columbia in December 1990, the first broadband (0.3-12keV) X-ray observatory to use focusing optics.

In collaboration with X-ray astronomers in Japan, Goddard supplied conical foil X-ray optics have been used for the joint Japanese and American ASCA mission (1993-2000). It was the first broadband imaging observatory using CCD non-dispersive spectrometers.

Substantial improvement in the capability of solid-state non-dispersive spectrometers has been achieved in our lab (in collaboration with the University of Wisconsin) by the successful development of quantum calorimeters with resolution better than 10 eV (FWHM). Such spectrometers have been used in a sounding-rocket-borne experiment to study spectral lines from the hot interstellar medium of our galaxy and will soon play a major role in the joint Japanese/American Suzaku orbiting X-ray observatory launched in July 2005.

The critical early stages of this program benefited from the technical support by Dale Arbogast, Frank Birsa, Ciro Cancro, Upendra Desai, Henry Doong, Charles Glasser, Sid Jones, and Frank Shaffer. More than 20 graduate students (mostly from the University of Maryland at College Park) have successfully carried out their PhD dissertation research within the X-ray astronomy program. Almost all of these former students have remained actively involved with astrophysics.

== Early research ==
=== The USA V-2 period ===
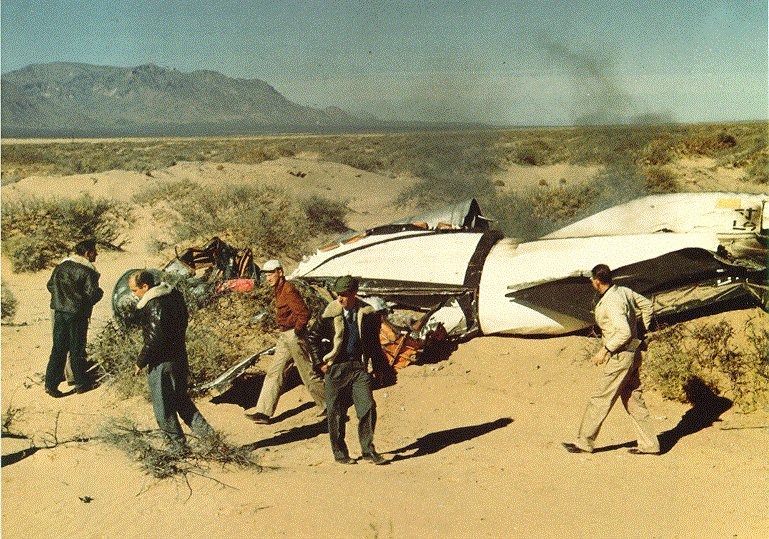
NRL scientists J. D. Purcell, C. Y. Johnson, and Dr. F. S. Johnson among those recovering instruments from a V-2 used for upper atmospheric research above the New Mexico desert. This is V-2 number 54, launched January 18, 1951 (photo by Dr. Richard Tousey, NRL).

The beginning of the search for X-ray sources from above the Earth's atmosphere was on August 5, 1948 12:07 GMT. A US Army V-2 as part of Project Hermes was launched from White Sands Proving Grounds Launch Complex (LC) 33. In addition to carrying experiments of the US Naval Research Laboratory for cosmic and solar radiation, temperature, pressure, ionosphere, and photography, there was on board a solar X-ray test detector, which functioned properly. The missile reached an apogee of 166 km.

As part of a collaboration between the US Naval Research Laboratory (NRL) and the Signal Corps Engineering Laboratory (SCEL) of the University of Michigan, another V-2 (V-2 42 configuration) was launched from White Sands LC33 on December 9, 1948 at 16:08 GMT (09:08 local time). The missile reached an apogee of 108.7 km and carried aeronomy (winds, pressure, temperature), solar X-ray and radiation, and biology experiments.

On January 28, 1949, an NRL X-ray detector (Blossom) was placed in the nose cone of a V-2 rocket and launched at White Sands Missile Range in New Mexico. X-rays from the Sun were detected. Apogee: 60 km.

A second collaborative effort (NRL/SCEL) using a V-2 UM-3 configuration launched on April 11, 1949 at 22:05 GMT. Experiments included solar X-ray detection, apogee: 87.4 km.

NRL Ionosphere 1 solar X-ray, ionosphere, meteorite mission launched a V-2 on September 29, 1949 from White Sands at 16:58 GMT and reached 151.1 km.

Using V-2 53 configuration a solar X-ray experiment was launched on February 17, 1950 from White Sands LC 33 at 18:01 GMT reaching an apogee of 148 km.

The last V-2 launch number TF2/TF3 came on August 22, 1952 07:33 GMT from White Sands reaching an apogee of 78.2 km and carried experiments

- solar X-ray for NRL,
- cosmic radiation for the National Institute of Health (NIH), and
- sky brightness for the Air Research and Development Command.

=== Aerobee period ===
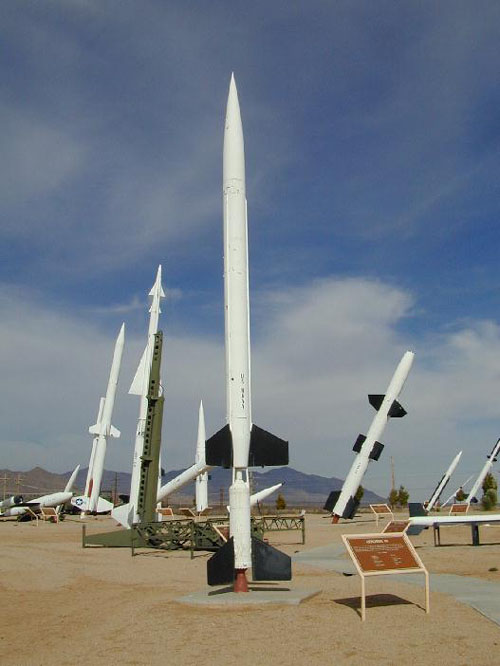
Aerobee Hi Missile, White Sands Missile Range Museum.

The first successful launch of an Aerobee occurred on May 5, 1952 13:44 GMT from White Sands Proving Grounds launch complex LC35. It was an Aerobee RTV-N-10 configuration reaching an apogee of 127 km with NRL experiments for solar X-ray and ultraviolet detection.

On April 19, 1960, an Office of Naval Research Aerobee Hi made a series of X-ray photographs of the Sun from an altitude of 208 km. The mainstay of the US IGY rocket stable was the Aerobee Hi, which was modified and improved to create the Aerobee 150.

An Aerobee 150 rocket launched on June 12, 1962 detected the first X-rays from other celestial sources (Scorpius X-1).

=== USSR V-2 derivative launches ===
Starting on June 21, 1959 from Kapustin Yar, with a modified V-2 designated the R-5V, the USSR launched a series of four vehicles to detect solar X-rays: a R-2A on July 21, 1959 and two R-11A at 02:00 GMT and 14:00 GMT.

=== Skylark ===
The British Skylark was probably the most successful of the many sounding rocket programs. The first launched in 1957 from Woomera, Australia and its 441st and final launch took place from Esrange, Sweden on 2 May 2005. Launches were carried out from sites in Australia, Europe, and South America, with use by NASA, the European Space Research Organisation (ESRO), and German and Swedish space organizations. Skylark was used to obtain the first good-quality X-ray images of the solar corona.

The first X-ray surveys of the sky in the Southern Hemisphere were provided by Skylark launches. It was also used with high precision in September and October 1972 in an effort to locate the optical counterpart of X-ray source GX3+1 by lunar occultation.

=== Véronique ===
The French Véronique was successfully launched on April 14, 1964 from Hammaguira, LC Blandine carrying experiments to measure UV and X-ray intensities and the FU110 to measure UV intensity from the atomic H (Lyman-α) line, and again on November 4, 1964.

=== Early satellites ===
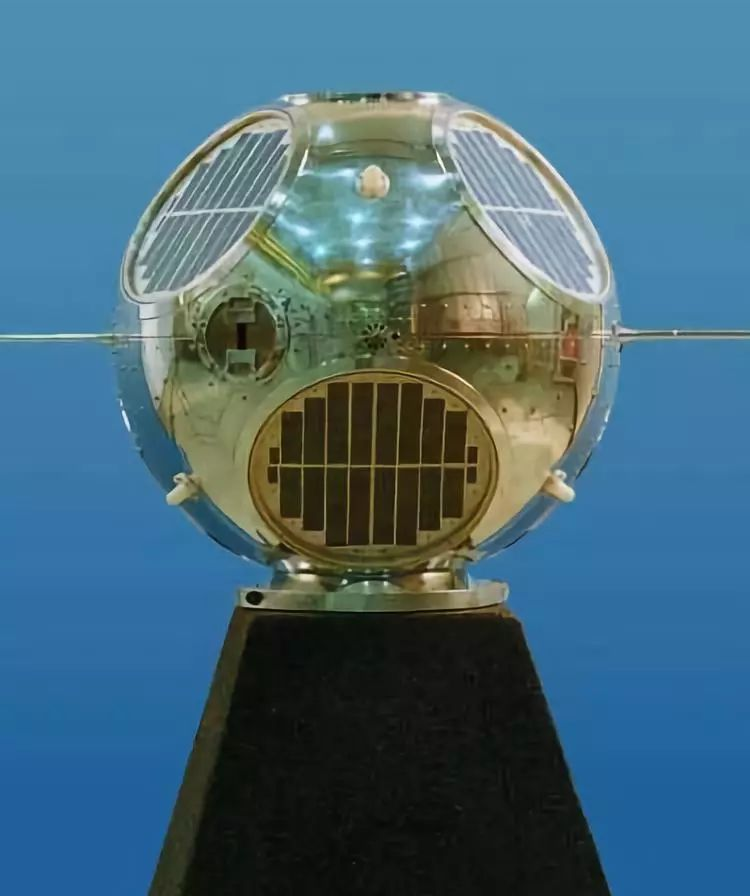
This is a display model of a GRAB satellite at the National Cryptologic Museum. The satellites carried two sets of instruments: an unclassified experiment (called Solrad) and a then-classified payload to collect electronic intelligence (ELINT) (called Tattletale).

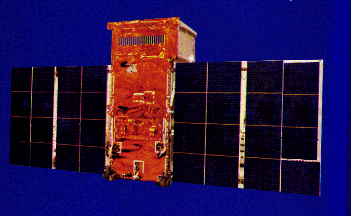
The satellites launched with the Thor-Delta rocket system became known as the TD satellites. TD-1A was successfully launched on March 11, 1972 from Vandenberg Air Force Base (March 12 in Europe).

The SOLar RADiation satellite program (SOLRAD) was conceived in the late 1950s to study the Sun's effects on Earth, particularly during periods of heightened solar activity. Solrad 1 was launched on June 22, 1960 aboard a Thor Able from Cape Canaveral at 1:54 a.m. EDT. As the world's first orbiting astronomical observatory, SOLRAD I determined that radio fade-outs were caused by solar X-ray emissions.

The first in a series of 8 successfully launched Orbiting Solar Observatories (OSO 1, launched on March 7, 1963) had as its primary mission to measure solar electromagnetic radiation in the UV, X-ray, and gamma-ray regions.

The first USA satellite which detected cosmic X-rays was the Third Orbiting Solar Observatory, or OSO-3, launched on March 8, 1967. It was intended primarily to observe the Sun, which it did very well during its 2-year lifetime, but it also detected a flaring episode from the source Sco X-1 and measured the diffuse cosmic X-ray background.

OSO 5 was launched on January 22, 1969, and lasted until July 1975. It was the 5th satellite put into orbit as part of the Orbiting Solar Observatory program. This program was intended to launch a series of nearly identical satellites to cover an entire 11-year solar cycle. The circular orbit had an altitude of 555 km and an inclination of 33°. The spin rate of the satellite was 1.8 s. The data produced a spectrum of the diffuse background over the energy range 14-200 keV.

OSO 6 was launched on August 9, 1969. Its orbital period was ~95 min. The spacecraft had a spin rate of 0.5 rps. On board was a hard X-ray detector (27-189 keV) with a 5.1 cm^{2} NaI(Tl) scintillator, collimated to 17° × 23° FWHM. The system had 4 energy channels (separated 27-49-75-118-189 keV). The detector spun with the spacecraft on a plane containing the Sun direction within ± 3.5°. Data were read with alternate 70 ms and 30 ms integrations for 5 intervals every 320 ms.

TD-1A was put in a nearly circular polar Sun-synchronous orbit, with apogee 545 km, perigee 533 km, and inclination 97.6°. It was ESRO's first 3-axis stabilized satellite, with one axis pointing to the Sun to within ±5°. The optical axis was maintained perpendicular to the solar pointing axis and to the orbital plane. It scanned the entire celestial sphere every 6 months, with a great circle being scanned every satellite revolution. After about 2 months of operation, both of the satellite's tape recorders failed. A network of ground stations was put together so that real-time telemetry from the satellite was recorded for about 60% of the time. After 6 months in orbit, the satellite entered a period of regular eclipses as the satellite passed behind the Earth—cutting off sunlight to the solar panels. The satellite was put into hibernation for 4 months, until the eclipse period passed, after which systems were turned back on and another 6 months of observations were made. TD-1A was primarily a UV mission however it carried both a cosmic X-ray and a gamma-ray detector. TD-1A reentered on January 9, 1980.

== Surveying and cataloging X-ray sources ==
OSO 7 was primarily a solar observatory designed to point a battery of UV and X-ray telescopes at the Sun from a platform mounted on a cylindrical wheel. The detectors for observing cosmic X-ray sources were X-ray proportional counters. The hard X-ray telescope operated over the energy range 7 - 550 keV. OSO 7 performed an X-ray All-sky survey and discovered the 9-day periodicity in Vela X-1 which led to its optical identification as a HMXRB. OSO 7 was launched on September 29, 1971 and operated until May 18, 1973.

Skylab, a science and engineering laboratory, was launched into Earth orbit by a Saturn V rocket on May 14, 1973. Detailed X-ray studies of the Sun were performed. The S150 experiment performed a faint X-ray source survey. The S150 was mounted atop the SIV-B upper stage of the Saturn 1B rocket which orbited briefly behind and below Skylab on July 28, 1973. The entire SIV-B stage underwent a series of preprogrammed maneuvers, scanning about 1° every 15 seconds, to allow the instrument to sweep across selected regions of the sky. The pointing direction was determined during data processing, using the inertial guidance system of the SIV-B stage combined with information from two visible star sensors which formed part of the experiment. Galactic X-ray sources were observed with the S150 experiment. The experiment was designed to detect 4.0-10.0 nm photons. It consisted of a single large (~1500 cm^{2}) proportional counter, electrically divided by fine wire ground planes into separate signal-collecting areas and looking through collimator vanes. The collimators defined 3 intersecting fields of view (~2 × 20°) on the sky, which allowed source positions to be determined to ~ 30'. The front window of the instrument consisted of a 2 μm thick plastic sheet. The counter gas was a mixture of argon and methane. Analysis of the data from the S150 experiment provided strong evidence that the soft X-ray background cannot be explained as the cumulative effect of many unresolved point sources.

Skylab's solar studies: UV and X-ray solar photography for highly ionized atoms, X-ray spectrography of solar flares and active regions, and X-ray emissions of lower solar corona.

Salyut 4 space station was launched on December 26, 1974. It was in an orbit of 355 × 343 km, with an orbital period of 91.3 minutes, inclined at 51.6°. The X-ray telescope began observations on January 15, 1975.

Orbiting Solar Observatory (OSO 8) was launched on June 21, 1975. While OSO 8's primary objective was to observe the Sun, four instruments were dedicated to observations of other celestial X-ray sources brighter than a few milliCrab. A sensitivity of 0.001 of the Crab nebula source (= 1 "mCrab"). OSO 8 ceased operations on October 1, 1978.

== X-ray source variability ==
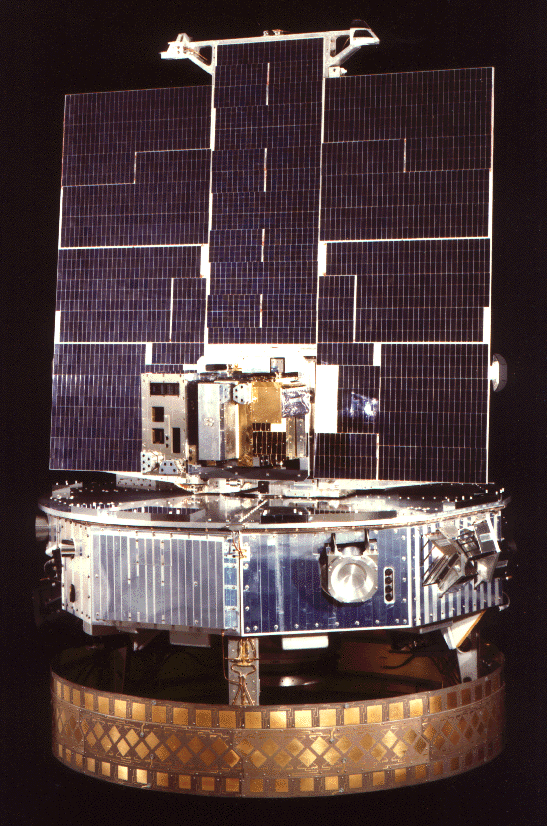
The P78-1 or Solwind satellite

Although several earlier X-ray observatories initiated the endeavor to study X-ray source variability, once the catalogs of X-ray sources were firmly established, more extensive studies could commence.

Prognoz 6 carried two NaI(Tl) scintillators (2-511 keV, 2.2-98 keV), and a proportional counter (2.2-7 keV) to study solar X-rays.

The Space Test Program spacecraft P78-1 or Solwind was launched on February 24, 1979 and continued operating until September 13, 1985, when it was shot down in orbit during an Air Force ASM-135 ASAT test. The platform was of the Orbiting Solar Observatory (OSO) type, with a solar-oriented sail and a rotating wheel section. P78-1 was in a noon-midnight, Sun-synchronous orbit at 600 km altitude. The orbital inclination of 96° implied that a substantial fraction of the orbit was spent at high latitude, where the particle background prevented detector operation. In-flight experience showed that good data were obtained between 35° N and 35° S geomagnetic latitude outside the South Atlantic Anomaly. This yields an instrument duty cycle of 25-30%. Telemetry data were obtained for about 40-50% of the orbits, yielding a net data return of 10-15%. Though this data rate appears low, it means that about 10^{8} seconds of good data reside in the XMON data base.

Data from the P78-1 X-Ray Monitor experiment offered source monitoring with a sensitivity comparable to that of instruments flown on SAS-3, OSO-8, or Hakucho, and the advantages of longer observing times and unique temporal coverage. Five fields of inquiry were particularly well suited for investigation with P78-1 data:

- study of pulsational, eclipse, precession, and intrinsic source variability on time scales of tens of seconds to months in galactic X-ray sources.
- pulse timing studies of neutron stars.
- identification and study of new transient sources.
- observations of X-ray and gamma-ray bursts, and other fast transients.
- simultaneous X-ray coverage of objects observed by other satellites, such as HEAO-2 and 3, as well as bridging the gap in coverage of objects in the observational timeline.

Launched on February 21, 1981, the Hinotori satellite observations of the 1980s pioneered hard X-ray imaging of solar flares.

Tenma was the second Japanese X-ray astronomy satellite launched on February 20, 1983. Tenma carried GSFC detectors which had an improved energy resolution (by a factor of 2) compared to proportional counters and performed the first sensitive measurements of the iron spectral region for many astronomical objects. Energy range: 0.1-60 keV; gas scintillator proportional counter: 10 units of 80 cm^{2} each, FOV ~ 3° (FWHM), 2-60 keV; transient source monitor: 2-10 keV.

The Soviet Astron orbital station was designed primarily for UV and X-ray astrophysical observations. It was injected into orbit on March 23, 1983. The satellite was put into a highly elliptical orbit, ~200,000 × 2,000 km. The orbit kept the craft far away from the Earth for 3.5 out of every 4 days. It was outside of the Earth's shadow and radiation belts for 90% of the time. The second major experiment, SKR-02M, aboard Astron was an X-ray spectrometer, which consisted of a proportional counter sensitive to 2-25 keV X-rays, with an effective area of 0.17 m^{2}. The FOV was 3° × 3° (FWHM). Data could be telemetered in 10 energy channels. The instrument began taking data on April 3, 1983.

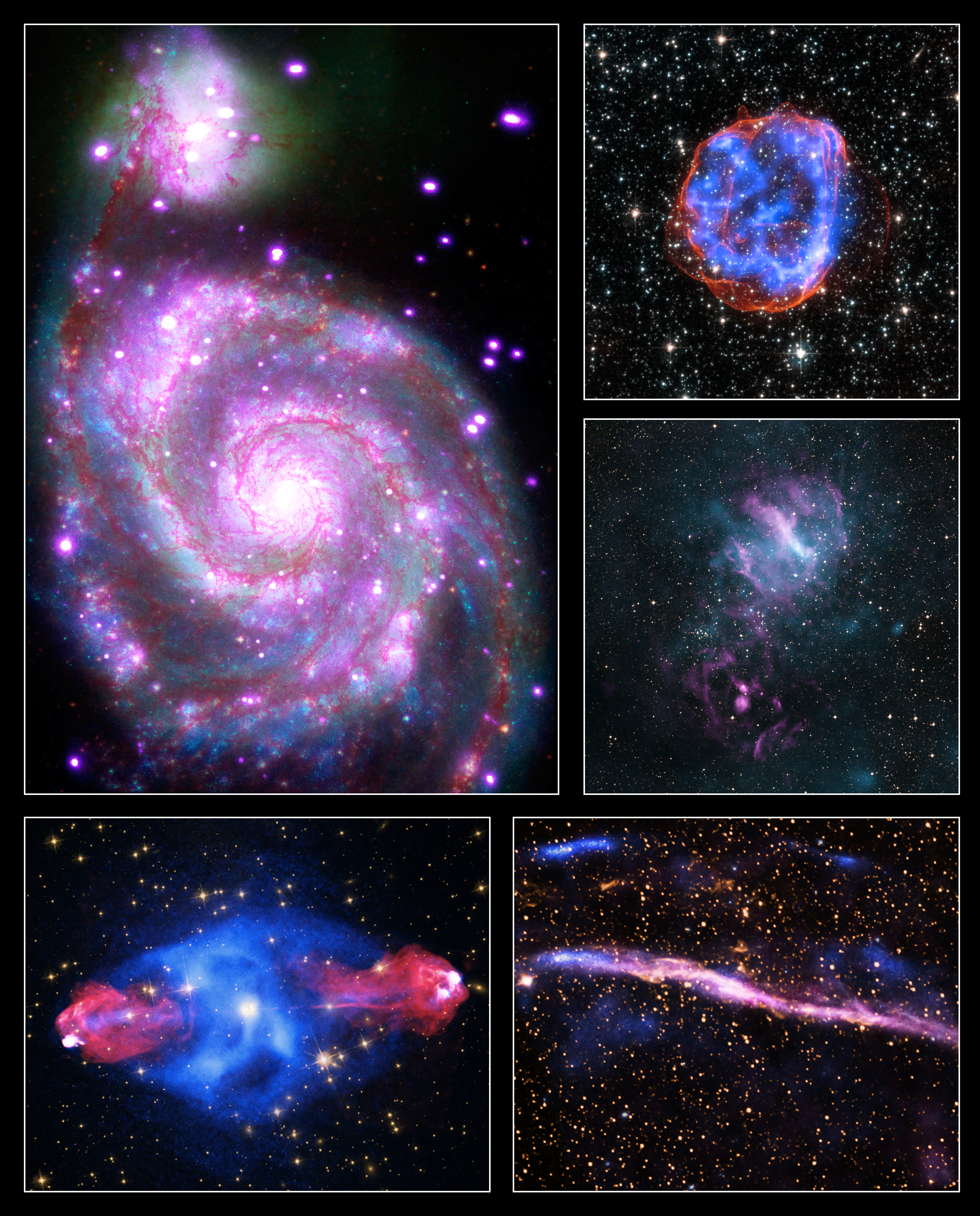
Images released to celebrate the International Year of Light 2015 (IYL 2015) (Chandra X-Ray Observatory).

Spacelab 1 was the first Spacelab mission in orbit in the payload bay of the Space Shuttle (STS-9) between November 28 and December 8, 1983. An X-ray spectrometer, measuring 2-30 keV photons (although 2-80 keV was possible), was on the pallet. The primary science objective was to study detailed spectral features in cosmic sources and their temporal changes. The instrument was a gas scintillation proportional counter (GSPC) with ~ 180 cm^{2} area and energy resolution of 9% at 7 keV. The detector was collimated to a 4.5° (FWHM) FOV. There were 512 energy channels.

Spartan 1 was deployed from the Space Shuttle Discovery (STS-51G) on June 20, 1985 and retrieved 45.5 hours later. The X-ray detectors aboard the Spartan platform were sensitive to the energy range 1-12 keV. The instrument scanned its target with narrowly collimated (5' × 3°) GSPCs. There were 2 identical sets of counters, each having ~ 660 cm^{2} effective area. Counts were accumulated for 0.812 s into 128 energy channels. The energy resolution was 16% at 6 keV. During its 2 days of flight, Spartan-1 observed the Perseus cluster of galaxies and the Galactic Center region.

Ginga was launched on February 5, 1987. The primary instrument for observations was the Large Area Proportional Counter (LAC).

The European Retrievable Carrier (EURECA) was launched July 31, 1992 by the Space Shuttle Atlantis, and put into an orbit at an altitude of 508 km. It began its scientific mission on August 7, 1992. EURECA was retrieved on July 1, 1993 by the Space Shuttle Endeavour and returned to Earth. On board was the WATCH or Wide Angle Telescope for Cosmic Hard X-rays instrument. The WATCH instrument was sensitive to 6-150 keV photons. The total field of view covered 1/4 of the celestial sphere. During its 11-month lifetime, EURECA tracked the Sun and WATCH gradually scanned across the entire sky. Some 2 dozen known X-ray sources were monitored—some for more than 100 days—and a number of new X-ray transients were discovered.

The Diffuse X-ray Spectrometer (DXS) STS-54 package was flown as an attached payload in January, 1993 to obtain spectra of the diffuse soft X-ray background. DXS obtained the first-ever high resolution spectra of the diffuse soft X-ray background in the energy band from 0.15 to 0.28 keV (4.3-8.4 nm).

== X-1 X-ray sources designation ==
As all-sky surveys are performed and analyzed or once the first extrasolar X-ray source in each constellation is confirmed, it is designated X-1, e.g., Scorpius X-1 or Sco X-1. There are 88 official constellations. Often the first X-ray source is a transient.

As X-ray sources have been better located, many of them have been isolated to extragalactic regions such as the Large Magellanic Cloud (LMC). When there are often many individually discernible sources, the first one identified is usually designated as the extragalactic source X-1, e.g., Small Magellanic Cloud (SMC) X-1, a HMXRB, at 01^{h}15^{m}14^{s} -73^{h}42^{m}22^{s}.

== X-ray source catalogs ==
Catalogs of X-ray sources have been put together for a variety of purposes including chronology of discovery, confirmation by X-ray flux measurement, initial detection, and X-ray source type.

=== Sounding rocket X-ray source catalogs ===
One of the first catalogs of X-ray sources published came from workers at the US Naval Research Laboratory in 1966 and contained 35 X-ray sources. Of these only 22 had been confirmed by 1968. An additional astronomical catalog of discrete X-ray sources over the celestial sphere by constellation contains 59 sources as of December 1, 1969, that at the least had an X-ray flux published in the literature.

=== Early X-ray observatory satellite catalogs ===
Each of the major observatory satellites had its own catalog of detected and observed X-ray sources. These catalogs were often the result of large area sky surveys. Many of the X-ray sources have names that come from a combination of a catalog abbreviation and the Right Ascension (RA) and Declination (Dec) of the object. For example, 4U 0115+63, 4th Uhuru catalog, RA=01 hr 15 min, Dec=+63°; 3S 1820-30 is the SAS-3 catalog; EXO 0748-676 is an Exosat catalog entry; HEAO 1 uses H; Ariel 5 is 3A; Ginga sources are in GS; general X-ray sources are in the X catalog. Of the early satellites, the Vela series X-ray sources have been cataloged.

The Uhuru X-ray satellite made extensive observations and produced at least 4 catalogs wherein previous catalog designations were improved and relisted: 1ASE or 2ASE 1615+38 would appear successively as 2U 1615+38, 3U 1615+38, and 4U 1615+3802, for example. After over a year of initial operation the first catalog (2U) was produced. The third Uhuru catalog was published in 1974. The fourth and final Uhuru catalog included 339 sources.

Although apparently not containing extrasolar sources from the earlier OSO satellites, the MIT/OSO 7 catalog contains 185 sources from the OSO 7 detectors and sources from the 3U catalog.

The 3rd Ariel 5 SSI Catalog (designated 3A) contains a list of X-ray sources detected by the University of Leicester's Sky Survey Instrument (SSI) on the Ariel 5 satellite. This catalog contains both low and high galactic latitude sources and includes some sources observed by HEAO 1, Einstein, OSO 7, SAS 3, Uhuru, and earlier, mainly rocket, observations. The second Ariel catalog (designated 2A) contains 105 X-ray sources observed before April 1, 1977. Prior to 2A some sources were observed that may not have been included.

The 842 sources in the HEAO A-1 X-ray source catalog were detected with the NRL Large Area Sky Survey Experiment on the HEAO 1 satellite.

When EXOSAT was slewing between different pointed observations from 1983 to 1986, it scanned a number of X-ray sources (1210). From this the EXOSAT Medium Energy Slew Survey catalog was created. From the use of the Gas Scintillation Proportional Counter (GSPC) on board EXOSAT, a catalog of iron lines from some 431 sources was made available.

=== Specialty and all-sky survey X-ray source catalogs ===
The Catalog of High-Mass X-ray Binaries in the Galaxy (4th Ed.) contains source name(s), coordinates, finding charts, X-ray luminosities, system parameters, and stellar parameters of the components and other characteristic properties for 114 HMXBs, together with a comprehensive selection of the relevant literature. About 60% of the high-mass X-ray binary candidates are known or suspected Be/X-ray binaries, while 32% are supergiant/X-ray binaries (SGXB).

For all the main-sequence and subgiant stars of spectral types A, F, G, and K and luminosity classes IV and V listed in the Bright Star Catalogue (BSC, also known as the HR Catalogue) that have been detected as X-ray sources in the ROSAT All-Sky Survey (RASS), there is the RASSDWARF - RASS A-K Dwarfs/Subgiants Catalog. The total number of RASS sources amounts to ~150,000 and in the BSC 3054 late-type main-sequence and subgiant stars of which 980 are in the catalog, with a chance coincidence of 2.2% (21.8 of 980).

== See also ==
- Gamma-ray astronomy
- Solar X-ray astronomy
- Stellar X-ray astronomy
- Ultraviolet astronomy
- X-1 X-ray source
- X-ray astronomy
- X-ray astronomy satellite
- X-ray telescope
