= Oso =

Oso, or OSO, may refer to:

== Places ==
- Oso, Ontario, a community and former township now part of Central Frontenac Township, Ontario, Canada
- Oso, Washington, a census-designated place in Snohomish County, Washington

== Music ==
- Oṣó, sixth studio album by Brymo
- Oso Oso, an emo band

== Other ==
- Oakville Symphony Orchestra
- Offensive Systems Officer, military aircrew member
- Ose (demon) or Oso
- Onsala Space Observatory
- Orbiting Solar Observatory, series of nine satellites
  - OSO 3
  - OSO 7
- Ottawa Symphony Orchestra
- Om Shanti Om, Hindi film starring Shahrukh Khan, Deepika Padukone and Arjun Rampal
- Special Council of the NKVD; Russian "ОСО," transliterated "OSO"
- Special Agent Oso, a Disney Channel animated show for children
- Osborne Mine Airport, IATA airport code "OSO"
- Osa (drone), Ukrainian business
- Oso (footballer), full name Joaquín Martínez Gauna, Spanish footballer

== See also ==
- El Oso, 1998 album by Soul Coughing
- El Oso, Ávila, in Spain
- Oso Kuka, Albanian folk hero
