= High Energy Astronomy Observatory =

High Energy Astrophysics Observatory can refer to:

- 1st High Energy Astronomy Observatory (HEAO 1)
- Einstein Observatory (HEAO 2)
- 3rd High Energy Astronomy Observatory (HEAO 3)
- HEAO Program

Note that the correct (original) names for these three satellites are "High Energy Astronomy Observatories", not "Astrophysics".
