= HD 8357 =

Binary star in the constellation Pisces

AR Piscium
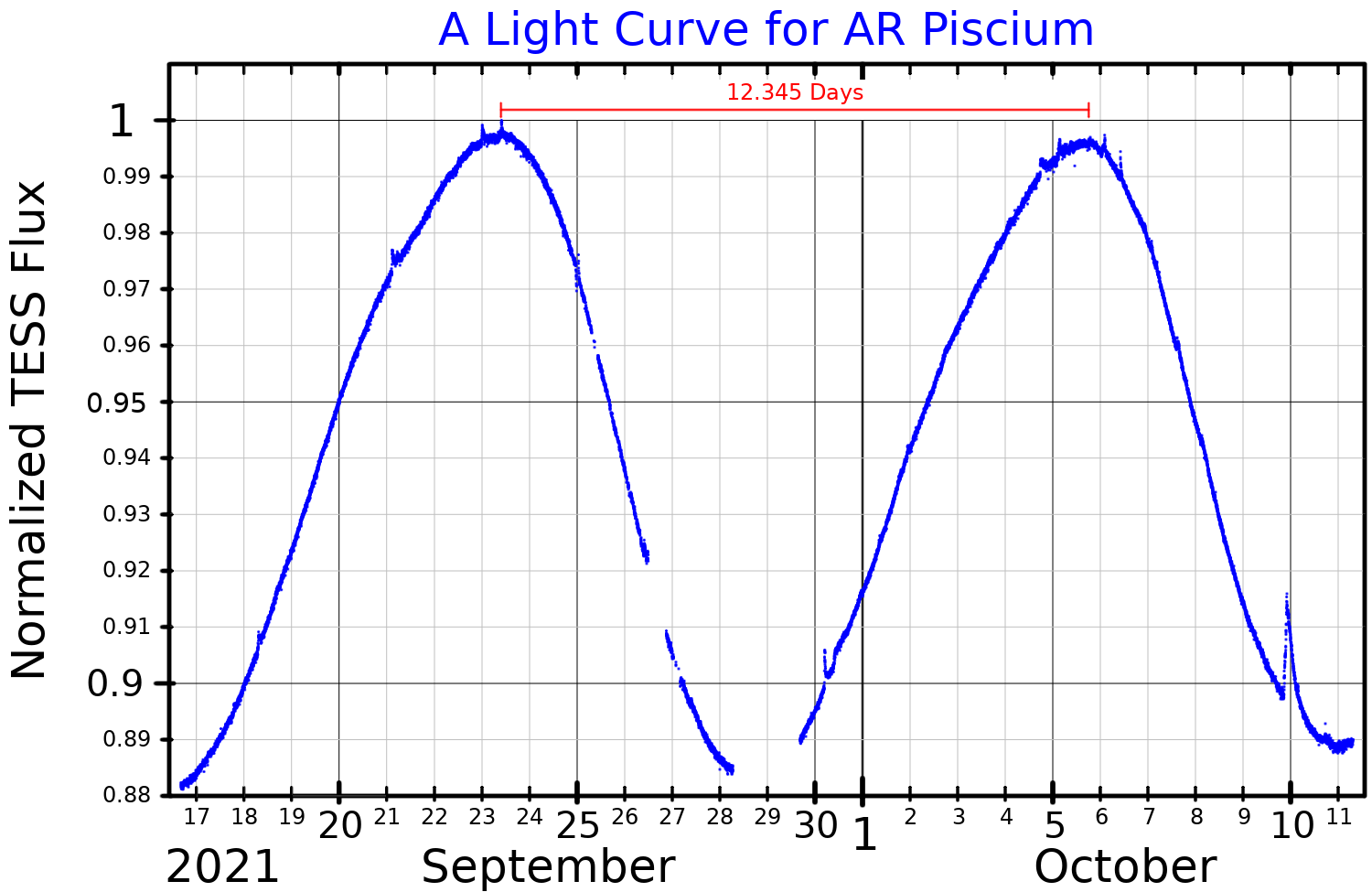
- A light curve for AR Piscium, plotted from TESS data, the 12.345 day variability period is shown in red.

Observation data Epoch J2000.0 Equinox ICRS
- Constellation: Pisces
- Right ascension: 01^{h} 22^{m} 56.757^{s}
- Declination: +07° 25′ 09.33″
- Apparent magnitude (V): 7.24 (7.68 + 8.43)

Characteristics

Primary
- Spectral type: Kl IV
- U−B color index: 0.68
- B−V color index: 0.93
- Variable type: RS CVn

Secondary
- Spectral type: G7 V
- U−B color index: 0.29
- B−V color index: 0.71

Astrometry
Radial velocity (R_{v})	20.59±0.02 km/s
Proper motion (μ)	RA: 94.296 mas/yr Dec.: 231.124 mas/yr
Parallax (π)	21.981±0.0447 mas
Distance	148.4 ± 0.3 ly (45.49 ± 0.09 pc)
Absolute magnitude (M_{V})	4.03

Orbit
Period (P)	14.30226±0.00010 d
Eccentricity (e)	0.185±0.004
Periastron epoch (T)	2446079.950±0.051 JD
Semi-amplitude (K_{1}) (primary)	25.37±0.09 km/s
Semi-amplitude (K_{2}) (secondary)	31.01±0.18 km/s

Details

Primary
Mass	1.12 M_{☉}
Surface gravity (log g)	3.46±0.06 cgs
Temperature	4,359±77 K
Metallicity [Fe/H]	−0.42 dex
Rotational velocity (v sin i)	12 km/s
Age	7−8 Gyr

Secondary
Mass	0.92 M_{☉}

Other designations
- AR Psc, BD+06 211, FK5 4126, GJ 3095, HD 8357, HIP 6454, SAO 109841, LTT 10501

Database references
SIMBAD	data

AR Piscium is a binary star system in the northern constellation of Canes Venatici, abbreviated AR Psc. It has the Henry Draper Catalogue identifier HD 8357; AR Piscium is its variable star designation. The pair have a combined apparent visual magnitude that fluctuates around 7.24, which is too faint to be readily visible to the naked eye. Parallax measurements place it at a distance of 148 light years from the Sun. The motion of this star through the Milky Way suggests it is a member of the intermediate disc population.

Variable X-ray source H0123+075 was identified from the HEAO 1 A-2 experiment and published by F. E. Marshall and associates in 1979. The following year, M. Garcia and associates identified the most probable source star as HD 8357, and determined it to be a RS Canum Venaticorum variable. This has a spectral class of G5 in the Henry Draper Catalogue. Optical observations by D. S. Hall and associates in 1980–1981 confirmed the source star to be optically variable with a period of 12.3±0.1 d. In 1993, AR Psc was identified as an extreme ultraviolet source by K. A. Pounds and associates using ROSAT.

This is a double-lined spectroscopic binary with an orbital period of 14.3 days and an eccentricity of 0.185. The mass ratio of the two components is 1.222±0.008. The primary component is an evolving subgiant star with a stellar classification of Kl IV. It is the chromospherically active member of this system, displaying visual flares. Intense X-ray flares have been detected. The smaller and less massive secondary star is a G-type main-sequence star with a stellar class of G7 V. Based on the significant difference between the orbital and photometric periods, the two stars are in pseudosynchronous rotation.
