= Allan S. Jacobson =

American astrophysicist (1932–1997)

Allan Stanley "Bud" Jacobson (June 18, 1932, Chattanooga, Tennessee – May 6, 1997, Altadena, California) was an American astrophysicist, known for his pioneering research in high-resolution gamma-ray spectroscopy.

== Biography ==
Soon after graduating from high school in Chattanooga, Jacobson joined the U.S. Air Force. While stationed in Japan, he sang and played the banjo in approximately 200 nightclub shows. During his military service he also became interested in military history and war games. After completing his military service, he returned to the US and by 1957 abandoned his attempts at a professional career in musical performances. He enrolled in night school in engineering at Los Angeles City College. He transferred in 1959 to the University of California, Los Angeles (UCLA), where he graduated in 1962 with a bachelor's degree. In 1962 he became a graduate student at the University of California, San Diego (UCSD), where he graduated in 1964 with an M.S. and in 1968 in Ph.D. His thesis work, supervised by Laurence E. Peterson, involved the design, construction, and balloon flight of a germanium detector. The detector recorded radioactivity emanating from the Crab Nebula. During the late 1960s, Jacobson collaborated extensively with Peterson, who headed UCSD's program in high energy astronomy.

After spending the academic year 1968–1969 at UCSD as an assistant research physicist working as a team member on the OSO 7 project, Jacobson joined in 1969 the staff of the Jet Propulsion Laboratory (JPL). In 1973 he was promoted to supervisor of JPL's High Energy Astrophysics Group. His group worked on gamma ray spectroscopy (at energies from a few keV to few MeV) with detectors flown on balloons and satellites. He led the development of the Gamma-ray Line Spectrometry Experiment. His team developed the High Spectral Resolution Gamma Ray Spectrometer (HSRGS), containing four cryogenic germanium gamma-ray detectors. The HSRGS was launched aboard HEAO-3 in September 1979 and operated until the cryogenic fluid was exhausted in 1980 on day 154 of the mission. The work of Jacobson and his colleagues resulted in an important discovery by HEAO-3, namely, the detection of radioactive decay of ^{26}Al occurring in the interstellar medium. This detection provided evidence for ongoing stellar nucleosynthesis and gave a quantitative basis for calculating the present rate of galactic-scale nucleosynthesis. Jacobson and his team also obtained significant new data about Cygnus X-1 and thereby confirmed it as a black hole. At the June 1986 meeting of the American Astronomical Society (AAS) in Ames, Iowa, he presented evidence from the HEAO-3 discoveries supporting the hypothesis of a supermassive black hole at the center of our Milky Way Galaxy.

In the last years of his career, Jacobson focused on the development of computer graphics for JPL. His Linked Windows Interactive Data System (LinkWinds), developed with Andrew L. Berkin and Martin W. Orton, was the co-winner of NASA's 1986 Software of the Year award. Jacobson also collaborated with the U.S. Air Force and U.S. Army in research on gamma-ray sensing for military surveillance and in development of several professional wargames. He acquired an extensive personal library on military history.

In 1980 Jacobson received the NASA Medal for Exceptional Scientific Achievement. In 1986 he was elected a Fellow der American Physical Society. and also received the Bruno Rossi Prize from the American Astronomical Society.

Allan Jacobson died at his home from heart failure. He was survived by his wife.

== Selected publications ==
- Hicks, Donovan Blake; Jacobson, Allan S. (1974). "A Ge(Li) Spectrometer for Gamma Ray Astronomy". IEEE Transactions on Nuclear Science. 21 (1): 169–177. Bibcode:1974ITNS...21..169H. doi:10.1109/TNS.1974.4327458. (Donovan Blake Hicks (1937–2012) retired as president and CEO of Ball Aerospace & Technologies. "Remembering Donovan Hicks". Space Foundation.)
- Jacobson, A.S.; Bishop, R.J.; Culp, G.W.; Jung, L.; Mahoney, W.A.; Willett, J.B. (1975). "A balloon-borne Ge(Li) spectrometer for gamma-ray astronomy". Nuclear Instruments and Methods. 127 (1): 115–124. Bibcode:1975NucIM.127..115J. doi:10.1016/0029-554X(75)90311-0.
- Ling, J. C.; Mahoney, W. A.; Willett, J. B.; Jacobson, A. S. (1977). "Measurement of 0.511-Mev gamma rays with a balloon-borne Ge(Li) spectrometer". Journal of Geophysical Research. 82 (10): 1463–1473. Bibcode:1977JGR....82.1463L. doi:10.1029/JA082i010p01463.
- Ling, J. C.; Mahoney, W. A.; Willett, J. B.; Jacobson, A. S. (1977). "A search for the reported 400-keV γ-ray line from Crab Nebula". Nature. 270 (5632): 36–37. Bibcode:1977Natur.270...36L. doi:10.1038/270036a0. S2CID 4175385. 1977 big team
- Mahoney, W.A.; Ling, J.C.; Jacobson, A.S. (1981). "Radiation damage of the HEAO C-1 germanium detectors". Nuclear Instruments and Methods in Physics Research. 185 (1–3): 449–458. Bibcode:1981NIMPR.185..449M. doi:10.1016/0029-554X(81)91243-X.
- Mahoney, W. A.; Ling, J. C.; Jacobson, A. S.; Lingenfelter, R. E. (1982). "Diffuse galactic gamma-ray line emission from nucleosynthetic Fe-60, Al-26, and Na-22 - Preliminary limits from HEAO 3". The Astrophysical Journal. 262: 742. Bibcode:1982ApJ...262..742M. doi:10.1086/160469.
- Lamb, R. C.; Ling, J. C.; Mahoney, W. A.; Riegler, G. R.; Wheaton, W. A.; Jacobson, A. S. (1983). "γ-Ray line emission from SS433". Nature. 305 (5929): 37–39. Bibcode:1983Natur.305...37L. doi:10.1038/305037a0. S2CID 4329896.
- Varnell, L. S.; Ling, J. C.; Mahoney, W. A.; Jacobson, A. S.; Pehl, R. H.; Goulding, F. S.; Landis, D. A.; Luke, P. N.; Madden, N. W. (1984). "A Position-Sensitive Germanium Detector for Gamma-Ray Astronomy". IEEE Transactions on Nuclear Science. 31 (1): 300–306. Bibcode:1984ITNS...31..300V. doi:10.1109/TNS.1984.4333264. S2CID 25245980.
- Mahoney, W. A.; Ling, J. C.; Jacobson, A. S. (1984). "HEAO 3 observations of the Crab pulsar". The Astrophysical Journal. 278: 784. Bibcode:1984ApJ...278..784M. doi:10.1086/161848.
- Riegler, G. R.; Ling, J. C.; Mahoney, W. A.; Wheaton, W. A.; Jacobson, A. S. (1985). "The Gamma-Ray Spectrum of the Galactic Center Region". The Astrophysical Journal. 294: L13. Bibcode:1985ApJ...294L..13R. doi:10.1086/184499.
- Ling, J. C.; Mahoney, W. A.; Wheaton, Wm. A.; Jacobson, A. S. (1987). "Long-Term Gamma-Ray Spectral Variability of Cygnus X-1". The Astrophysical Journal. 321: L117. Bibcode:1987ApJ...321L.117L. doi:10.1086/185017.
- Wheaton, Wm. A.; Jacobson, A. S.; Ling, J. C.; Mahoney, W. A.; Varnell, L. S. (1989). "The HEAO 3 background: Spectrum observed by a large germanium spectrometer in low earth orbit". AIP Conference Proceedings. Vol. 186. pp. 304–322. doi:10.1063/1.38199.
