= Elihu Boldt =

American astrophysicist (1931–2008)

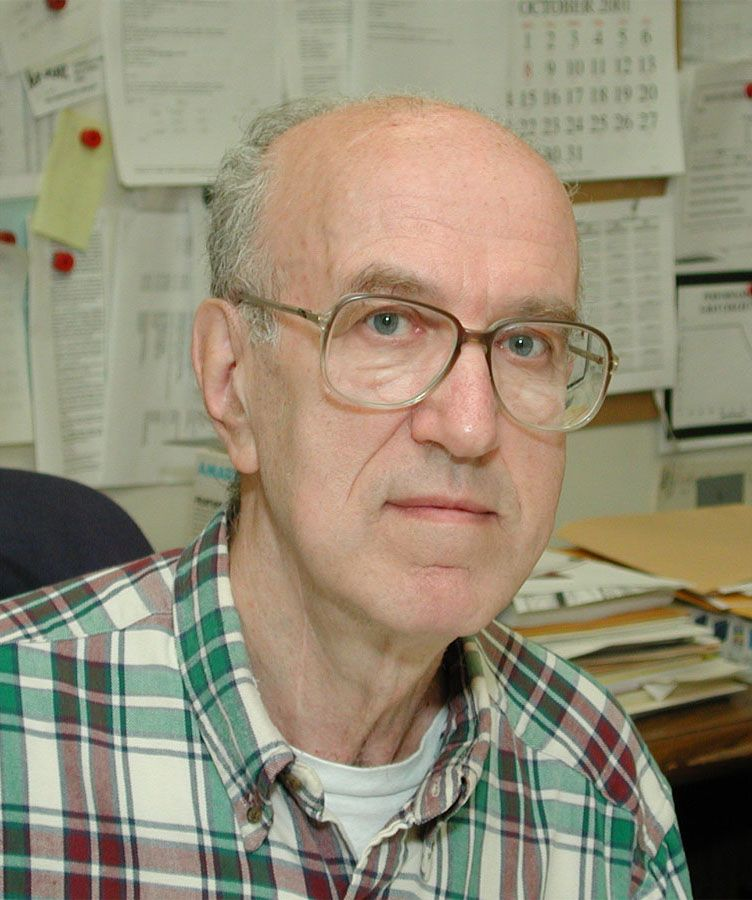
- Born: Elihu Aaron Boldt; July 15, 1931; New Brunswick, New Jersey, US
- Died: September 12, 2008 (aged 77)
- Education: MIT
- Scientific career
- Fields: cosmic ray physics, X-ray astronomy
- Workplaces: Brookhaven Laboratory, Rutgers University, NASA Goddard Space Flight Center
- Thesis: The lambda hyperon (1958)
- Doctoral advisor: David O. Caldwell

Elihu Aaron Boldt (15 July 1931–12 September 2008) was an American astrophysicist, who led an X-ray astronomy group at the NASA Goddard Space Flight Center for more than 30 years.

== Biography ==
Elihu Boldt was born in New Brunswick, New Jersey, on 15 July 1931. His father was a civil engineer who worked on construction of the New York subway and bridges; he died when Elihu was five. His mother was a schoolteacher. Studying on a full scholarship at MIT, and got a BS in 1953, and a PhD in physics in 1958. His thesis was on Lambda-Hyperon, with David Caldwell as an adviser; he also worked on cosmic rays with Bruno Rossi, whom he admired. He worked on the Cosmotron particle accelerator in the Brookhaven Laboratory for his thesis, and published several papers on Lambda decay modes and K meson interactions. There, he started to use cosmic rays as a source of accelerated particles.

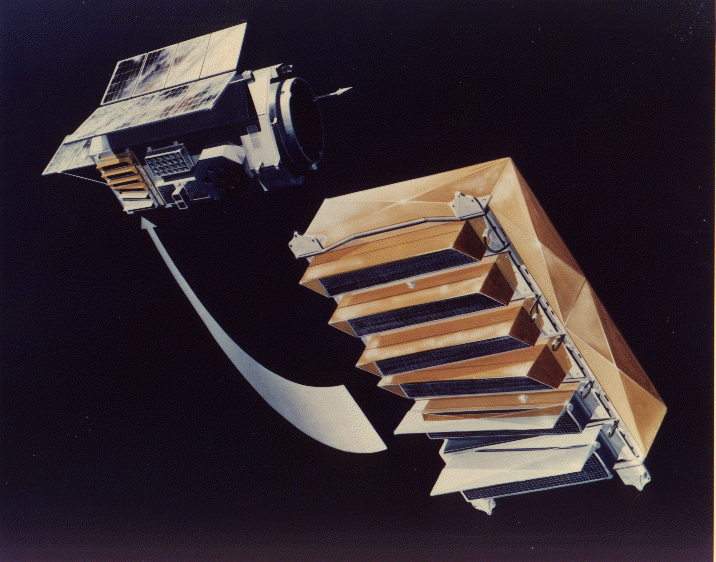
The A2 experiment of the HEAO-1 X-ray space telescope

Boldt became an assistant professor at Rutgers University in 1958, and stayed there for six years. At that time he also spent two years as a postdoc at Ecole Polytechnique in France, working on the Proton Synchrotron. Later, he worked as a postdoc with the Princeton cosmic rays group. He met his future wife, Yvette Benharroch, in Israel; they married in 1971 and had three children. While in France, he became an enthusiast of the French cuisine; he later joined a culinary society in the US.

In 1964 he started an X-ray astronomy group in the Laboratory for High Energy Physics (LHEA) at the Goddard Space Flight Center (GSFC), invited by Frank B. McDonald. Boldt's move from cosmic ray research to X-ray astronomy was quite unorthodox: in 1960s, the X-ray astronomy was not a popular area of study, because only stars were known to be X-ray sources.

The group focused on the X-ray sources in the Galactic Center, Cygnus, and the Crab Nebula, launching high altitude balloons and then sounding rockets from New Mexico and Australia. They also participated in the development of multiple spacecraft missions, developing the multi-wire proportional counters for the Orbiting Solar Observatory (OSO-8, 1975), High Energy Astronomy Observatory (HEAO-1, 1977; Boldt was a co-PI of the A2 full-sky cosmic X-ray experiment), and Rossi X-ray Timing Explorer (RXTE, 1995). The HEAO-1 detector had two fields of view to distinguish cosmic X-ray from noise.

Boldt was the head of the X-ray astronomy group from 1964 to 1995, and was awarded with the Outstanding Scientific Achievement and the Lindsay Memorial Award by the GSFC. He died on 12 September 2008 from a heart attack.

== Selected publications ==
- Boldt, Elihu; Caldwell, David O.; Pal, Yash (1958). "θ1^{0}−θ2^{0} Mass Difference". Physical Review Letters. 1 (4): 150–152. doi:10.1103/PhysRevLett.1.150.
- Boldt, Elihu; Bridge, Herbert S.; Caldwell, David O.; Pal, Yash (1958). "Helicity of the Proton from Λ^{0} Decay". Physical Review Letters. 1 (7): 256–258. Bibcode:1958PhRvL...1..256B. doi:10.1103/PhysRevLett.1.256.
- Balasubrahmanyan, V. K.; Boldt, E.; Palmeira, R. A. R. (1965). "Low-Energy Spectrum of Cosmic Rays as an Indicator of Primary Source Characteristics and Interstellar Propagation". Physical Review. 140 (4B): B1157–B1161. Bibcode:1965PhRv..140.1157B. doi:10.1103/PhysRev.140.B1157. hdl:2060/19660017742.
- Boldt, Elihu; McDonald, Frank B.; Riegler, Guenter; Serlemitsos, Peter (1966). "Extended Source of Energetic Cosmic X Rays". Physical Review Letters. 17 (8): 447–450. Bibcode:1966PhRvL..17..447B. doi:10.1103/PhysRevLett.17.447.
- Balasubrahmanyan, V. K.; Boldt, E.; Palmeira, R. A. R. (1967). "Solar modulation of galactic cosmic rays". Journal of Geophysical Research. 72: 27. Bibcode:1967JGR....72...27B. doi:10.1029/JZ072i001p00027. hdl:2060/19660020678.
- Boldt, Elihu A.; Desai, Upendra D.; Holt, Stephen S. (1969). "2-20keV Spectrum of X-Rays from the Crab Nebula and the Diffuse Background Near Galactic Anticenter". The Astrophysical Journal. 156: 427. Bibcode:1969ApJ...156..427B. doi:10.1086/149979. hdl:2060/19680026260.
- Boldt, E.; Serlemitsos, P. (1969). "Cosmic X-ray bremsstrahlung associated with suprathermal protons". Astrophysical Journal. 157: 557. Bibcode:1969ApJ...157..557B. doi:10.1086/150095.
- Boldt, Elihu A. (1981). "The High Energy Astronomy Observatory: HEAO-1". Journal of the Washington Academy of Sciences. 71 (1): 24–44. Bibcode:1981uhur.symp...24B. JSTOR 24537251.
- Boldt, Elihu; Leiter, Darryl (1981). "Precursor active galaxies and the cosmic X-ray background". Nature. 290 (5806): 483–485. Bibcode:1981Natur.290..483B. doi:10.1038/290483a0. hdl:2060/19810011472.
- Boldt, Elihu; Leiter, Darryl (1987). "Constraints on possible precursor AGN sources of the cosmic X-ray background". The Astrophysical Journal. 322: L1. Bibcode:1987ApJ...322L...1B. doi:10.1086/185025.
- Boldt, Elihu (1987). "The cosmic x-ray background". Physics Reports. 146 (4): 215–257. Bibcode:1987PhR...146..215B. doi:10.1016/0370-1573(87)90108-6. hdl:2060/19800014758.
- Zdziarski, Andrzej A.; Zycki, Piotr T.; Svensson, Roland; Boldt, Elihu (1993). "On Compton reflection in the sources of the cosmic X-ray background". The Astrophysical Journal. 405: 125. Bibcode:1993ApJ...405..125Z. doi:10.1086/172345.
- Miyaji, Takamitsu; Lahav, Ofer; Jahoda, Keith; Boldt, Elihu (1994). "The cosmic X-ray background-IRAS galaxy correlation and the local X-ray volume emissivity". The Astrophysical Journal. 434: 424. arXiv:astro-ph/9405013. Bibcode:1994ApJ...434..424M. doi:10.1086/174744.
- Boldt, E.; Ghosh, P. (1999). "Cosmic rays from remnants of quasars?". Monthly Notices of the Royal Astronomical Society. 307 (3): 491–494. arXiv:astro-ph/9902342. Bibcode:1999MNRAS.307..491B. doi:10.1046/j.1365-8711.1999.02600.x.
- Boldt, Elihu; Loewenstein, Michael (2000). "Cosmic ray generation by quasar remnants: Constraints and implications". Monthly Notices of the Royal Astronomical Society. 316 (3): L29–L33. arXiv:astro-ph/0006221. Bibcode:2000MNRAS.316L..29B. doi:10.1046/j.1365-8711.2000.03768.x.
