= Laurence E. Peterson =

American astronomer

Laurence E. Peterson is Emeritus Professor of Physics and Director of the Center for Astrophysics and Space Sciences at the University of California, San Diego, California. He received his Ph.D. in 1960 from the University of Minnesota, under John R. Winckler. He was a pioneer in the field of X-ray astronomy. He led the high-energy astronomy group at UCSD for many years. In addition to carrying out numerous experiments using high-altitude balloons, he was principal investigator on several NASA satellite experiments, including one on the OSO 1, one on OSO 3, two on OSO 7, the A4 experiment on HEAO 1, and co-investigator on the High Energy X-Ray Timing Experiment (HEXTE) flown on the Rossi X-ray Timing Explorer.

His doctoral students include Allan S. Jacobson.

== Major publications ==
- Instrumental Technique in X-Ray Astronomy. Annual Review of Astronomy and Astrophysics 13, 423 (1975). doi:10.1146/annurev.aa.13.090175.002231
- 2-165 keV Observations of Active Galaxies and the Diffuse Background. With R.E. Rothschild, et al. Astrophys. J. 269, 423 (1982).
- A Scanning Modulation Collimator Observation of the High Energy X-Ray Source in the Crab Nebula. With R.M. Pelling et al. Astrophys. J. 319, 416 (1987).
- Observation of SN 1987A with the gamma-ray spectrometer HEXAGONE. With C.G.L. Chapuis, et al. Astrophys. J. 403, 332 (1993). doi:10.1086/172206
- Compton-Backscattered Annihilation Radiation from the Galactic Center Region. With D.M. Smith et al. Astrophys. J, 414, 165 (1993). Bibcode:1993ApJ...414..165S
