= High Energy Astronomy Observatory 3 =

Space observatory

HEAO-3
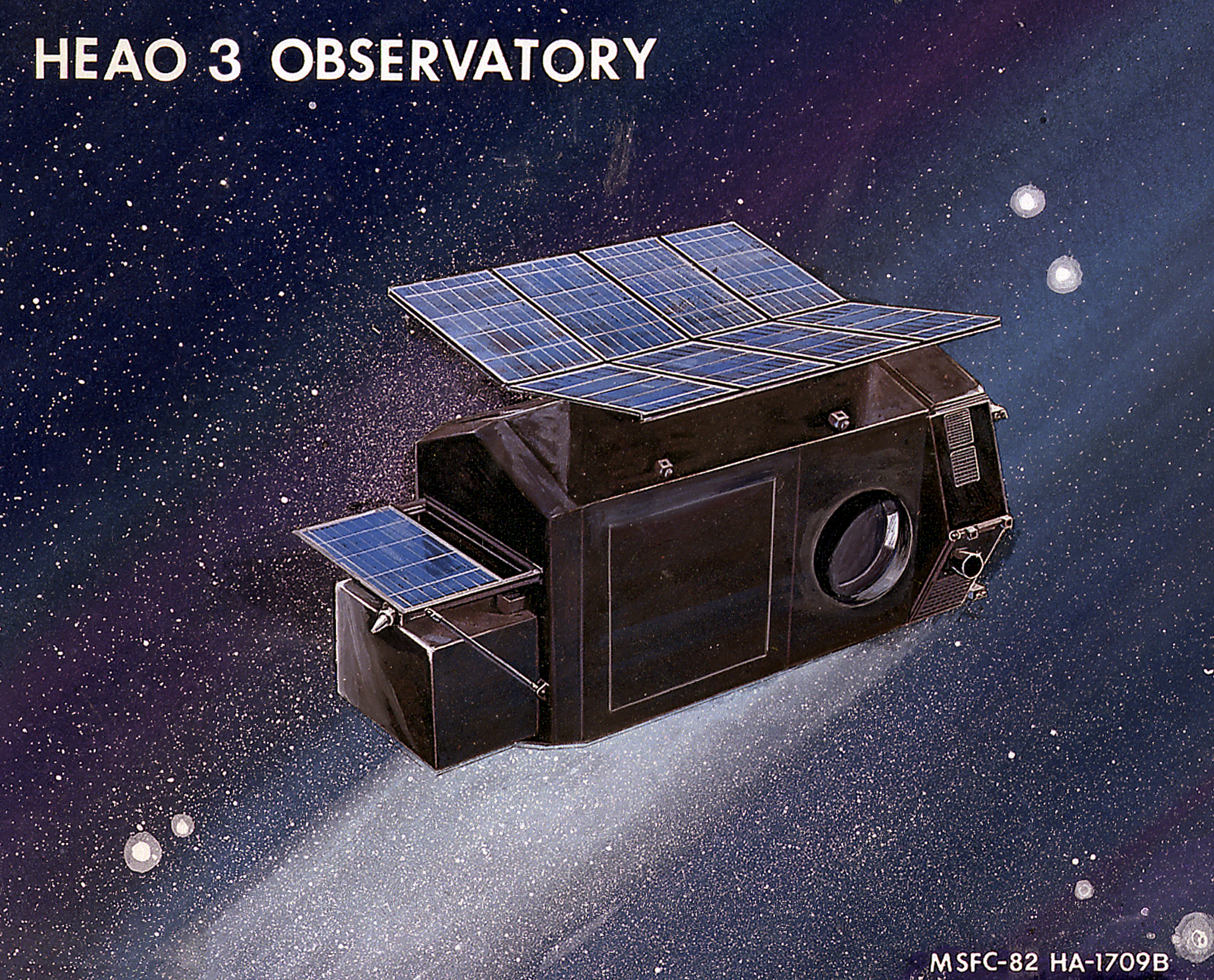
- Mission type: Astronomy
- Operator: NASA
- COSPAR ID: 1979-082A
- SATCAT no.: 11532

Spacecraft properties
- Manufacturer: TRW
- Dry mass: 2,660.2 kilograms (5,865 lb)

Start of mission
- Launch date: 20 September 1979, 05:27:00 UTC
- Rocket: Atlas SLV-3D Centaur-D1AR
- Launch site: Cape Canaveral LC-36B

End of mission
- Decay date: 7 December 1981

Orbital parameters
- Reference system: Geocentric
- Regime: Low Earth
- Eccentricity: 0.00134
- Perigee altitude: 486.4 kilometres (302.2 mi)
- Apogee altitude: 504.9 kilometres (313.7 mi)
- Inclination: 43.6°
- Period: 94.50 minutes

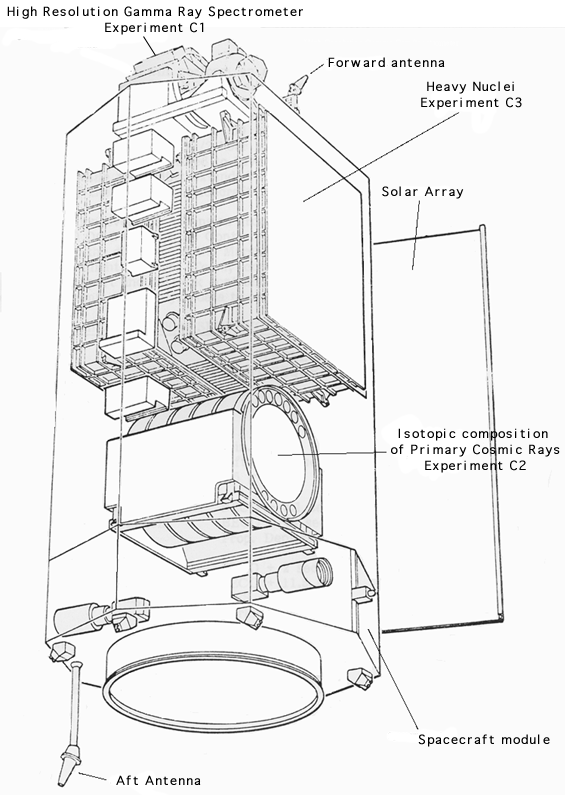
Diagram of HEAO 3 Satellite

The last of NASA's three High Energy Astronomy Observatories, HEAO 3 was launched 20 September 1979 on an Atlas-Centaur launch vehicle, into a nearly circular, 43.6 degree inclination low Earth orbit with an initial perigeum of 486.4 km. The normal operating mode was a continuous celestial scan, spinning approximately once every 20 min about the spacecraft z-axis, which was nominally pointed at the Sun. Total mass of the observatory at launch was 2,660.0 kilograms (5,864.3 lb).

HEAO 3 included three scientific instruments: the first a cryogenic high-resolution germanium gamma-ray spectrometer, and two devoted to cosmic-ray observations. The scientific objectives of the mission's three experiments were:

(1) to study intensity, spectrum, and time behavior of X-ray and gamma-ray sources between 0.06 and 10 MeV; measure isotropy of the diffuse X-ray and gamma-ray background; and perform an exploratory search for X-and gamma-ray line emissions;

(2) to determine the isotopic composition of the most abundant components of the cosmic-ray flux with atomic mass between 7 and 56, and the flux of each element with atomic number (Z) between Z = 4 and Z = 50;

(3) to search for super-heavy nuclei up to Z = 120 and measure the composition of the nuclei with Z >20.

== The Gamma-ray Line Spectrometer Experiment ==
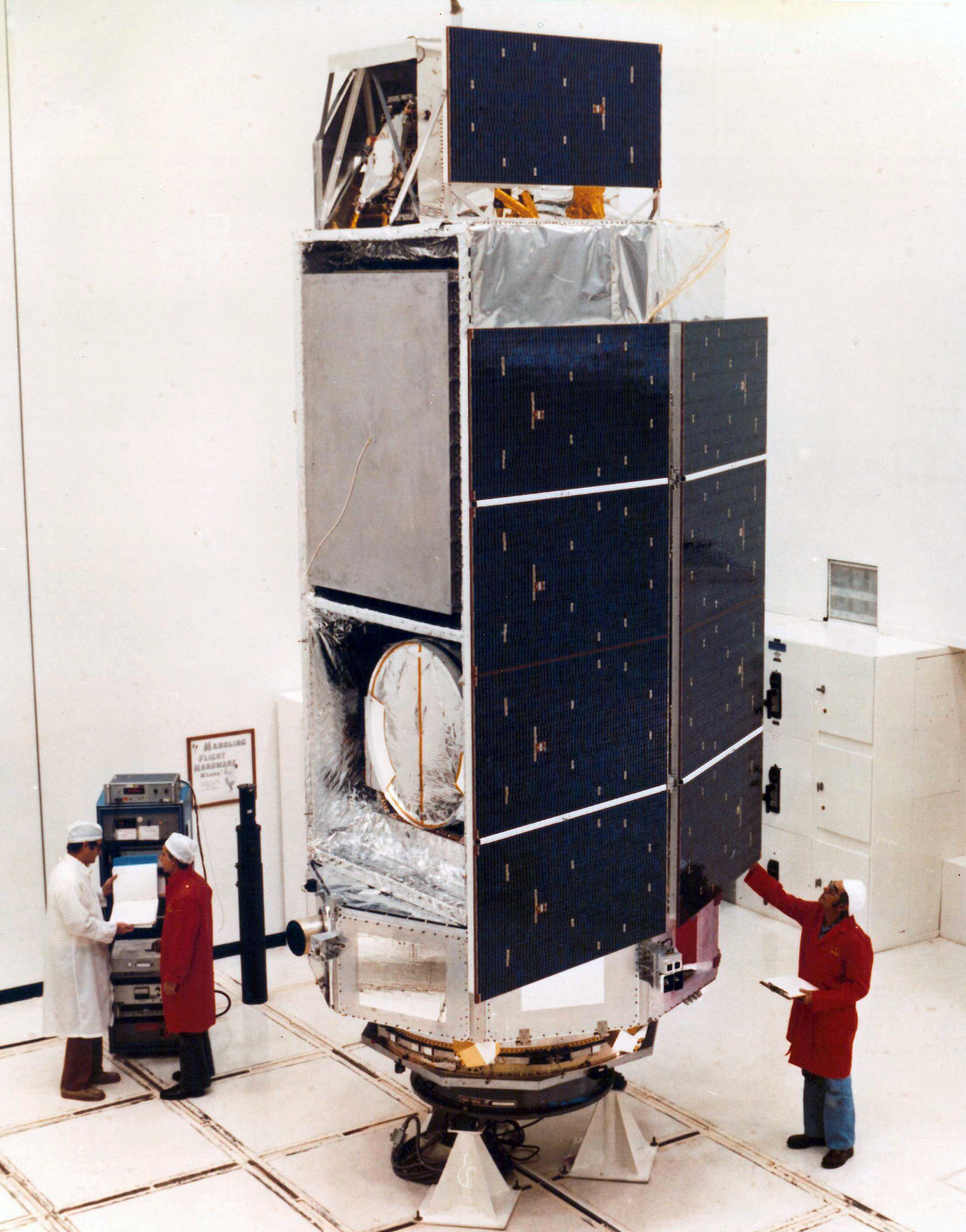
HEAO 3 in the clean room

The HEAO "C-1" instrument (as it was known before launch) was a sky-survey experiment, operating in the hard X-ray and low-energy gamma-ray bands. The gamma-ray spectrometer was especially designed to search for the 511 keV gamma-ray line produced by the annihilation of positrons in stars, galaxies, and the interstellar medium (ISM), nuclear gamma-ray line emission expected from the interactions of cosmic rays in the ISM, the radioactive products of cosmic nucleosynthesis, and nuclear reactions due to low-energy cosmic rays. In addition, careful study was made of the spectral and time variations of known hard X-ray sources.

The experimental package contained four cooled, p-type high-purity Ge gamma-ray detectors with a total volume of about 100 cm$^3$, enclosed in a thick (6.6 cm average) caesium iodide (CsI) scintillation shield in active anti-coincidence to suppress extraneous background. The experiment was capable of measuring gamma-ray energies falling within the energy interval from 0.045 to 10 MeV. The Ge detector system had an initial energy resolution better than 2.5 keV at 1.33 MeV and a line sensitivity from 1.E-4 to 1.E-5 photons/cm^{2}-s, depending on the energy. Key experimental parameters were (1) a geometry factor of 11.1 cm^{2}-sr, (2) effective area ~75 cm$^2$ at 100 keV, (3) a field of view of ~30 deg FWHM at 45 keV, and (4) a time resolution of less than 0.1 ms for the germanium detectors and 10 s for the CsI detectors. The gamma-ray spectrometer operated until 1 June 1980, when its cryogen was exhausted. The energy resolution of the Ge detectors was subject to degradation (roughly proportional to energy and time) due to radiation damage. The primary data are available at from the NASA HESARC and at JPL. They include instrument, orbit, and aspect data plus some spacecraft housekeeping information on 1600-bpi binary tapes. Some of this material has subsequently been archived on more modern media. The experiment was proposed, developed, and managed by the Jet Propulsion Laboratory of the California Institute of Technology, under the direction of Dr. Allan S. Jacobson.

== The Isotopic Composition of Primary Cosmic Rays Experiment ==
The HEAO C-2 experiment measured the relative composition of the isotopes of the primary cosmic rays between beryllium and iron (Z from 4 to 26) and the elemental abundances up to tin (Z=50). Cerenkov counters and hodoscopes, together with the Earth's magnetic field, formed a spectrometer. They determined charge and mass of cosmic rays to a precision of 10% for the most abundant elements over the momentum range from 2 to 25 GeV/c (c=speed of light). Scientific direction was by Principal Investigators Prof. Bernard Peters and Dr. Lyoie Koch-Miramond. The primary data base has been archived at the Centre Etudes Nuclearires de Saclay and the Danish Space Research Institute. Information on the data products is given by Engelman et al. 1985.

== The Heavy Nuclei Experiment ==
The purpose of the HEAO C-3 experiment was to measure the charge spectrum of cosmic-ray nuclei over the nuclear charge (Z) range from 17 to 120, in the energy interval 0.3 to 10 GeV/nucleon; to characterize cosmic ray sources; processes of nucleosynthesis, and propagation modes. The detector consisted of a double-ended instrument of upper and lower hodoscopes and three dual-gap ion chambers. The two ends were separated by a Cerenkov radiator. The geometrical factor was 4 cm^{2}-sr. The ion chambers could resolve charge to 0.24 charge units at low energy and 0.39 charge units at high energy and high Z. The Cerenkov counter could resolve 0.3 to 0.4 charge units. Binns et al. give more details. The experiment was proposed and managed by the Space Radiation Laboratory of the California Institute of Technology (Caltech), under the direction of Principal Investigator Prof. Edward C. Stone, Jr. of Caltech, and Dr. Martin H. Israel, and Dr. Cecil J. Waddington.

== Project ==
The HEAO 3 Project was the final mission in the High Energy Astronomy Observatory series, which was managed by the NASA Marshall Space Flight Center (MSFC), where the project scientist was Dr. Thomas A. Parnell, and the project manager was Dr. John F. Stone. The prime contractor was TRW.

== See also ==
- HEAO Program
- High Energy Astronomy Observatory 1
- Einstein Observatory (HEAO 2)
