= OSO 3 =

American satellite launched in 1967

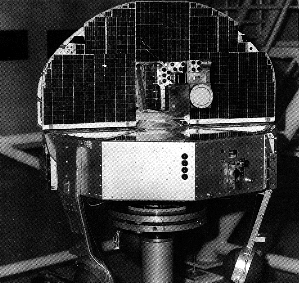
- The third Orbiting Solar Observatory, OSO 3, showing its "Sail" (upper), carrying solar experiments pointed at the Sun, and its rotating "Wheel" (lower), carrying two sky-scanning survey instruments: the UCSD hard X-ray experiment, and the MIT gamma-ray telescope
- Mission type: Solar physics
- Operator: NASA
- COSPAR ID: 1967-020A
- SATCAT no.: 02703
- Mission duration: 2 years, 8 months

Spacecraft properties
- Manufacturer: BBRC
- Launch mass: 281 kilograms (619 lb)

Start of mission
- Launch date: March 8, 1967, 16:19:00 UTC
- Rocket: Delta C
- Launch site: Cape Canaveral LC-17A

End of mission
- Last contact: November 10, 1969
- Decay date: April 4, 1982

Orbital parameters
- Reference system: Geocentric
- Regime: Low Earth
- Eccentricity: 0.002164
- Perigee altitude: 534 kilometers (332 mi)
- Apogee altitude: 564 kilometers (350 mi)
- Inclination: 32.87 degrees
- Period: 95.53 minutes
- Mean motion: 15.07
- Epoch: May 8, 1967, 11:19:00 UTC

OSO 3 (Orbiting Solar Observatory 3), or Third Orbiting Solar Observatory (known as OSO E2 before launch) was launched on March 8, 1967, into a nearly circular orbit of mean altitude 550 km, inclined at 33° to the equatorial plane. Its on-board tape recorder failed on June 28, 1968, allowing only the acquisition of sparse real-time data during station passes thereafter; the last data were received on November 10, 1969. OSO 3 reentered the Earth's atmosphere and burned up on April 4, 1982.

Like all of the early Orbiting Solar Observatory (OSO) series satellites, it had two major segments: one, the "Sail", was stabilized to face the Sun, and carried both solar panels and Sun-pointing experiments for solar physics. The other, "Wheel" section, rotated to provide overall gyroscopic stability and also carried sky-scanning instruments that swept the sky as the wheel turned, approximately every 2 seconds. OSO-8, the final spacecraft in this series, had 3-axis pointing.

== Instrumentation ==
Experiments on board OSO 3
Name	Target	Principal Investigator
High Energy Gamma Ray (> 50 MeV)	anti-solar	Kraushaar, W. L., Massachusetts Institute of Technology
Cosmic Ray Spectrum Detector and Gamma Ray Analyzer	Sun, all-sky	Kaplon, Morton F, University of Rochester
Directional Radiometer Experiment	Earth	Neel, Carr B Jr, NASA Ames Research Center
Earth Albedo (0.32- to 0.78-μm)	Earth	Neel, Carr B Jr, NASA Ames Research Center
Solar EUV Spectrometer 0.1 to 40.0 nm	Sun	Neupert, Werner M, NASA Goddard Space Flight Center
0.8- to 1.2-nm Solar X-Ray Ion Chamber	Sun	Teske, Richard G, University of Michigan
Solar and Celestial Gamma-Ray Telescope (7.7 to 200 keV)	Sun, all-sky	Laurence E. Peterson University of California, San Diego
Thermal Radiation Emissivity	near-Earth space environment	Neel, Carr B Jr, NASA Ames Research Center
Extreme Ultraviolet Spectrometer	Sun	Hinteregger, Hans E, Phillips Laboratory

The Sail carried a hard X-ray experiment from UCSD, with a single thin NaI(Tl) scintillation crystal plus phototube enclosed in a howitzer-shaped CsI(Tl) anti-coincidence shield. The energy resolution was 45% at 30 keV. The instrument operated from 7.7 to 210 keV with 6 channels. The Principal Investigator (PI) was Prof. Laurence E. Peterson of UCSD. Also in the wheel was a cosmic gamma-ray (>50 MeV) sky survey instrument contributed by MIT, with PI Prof. William L. Kraushaar.

== Scientific results ==
OSO-3 obtained extensive hard X-ray observations of solar flares, the cosmic diffuse X-ray background, and multiple observations of Scorpius X-1, the first observation of an extrasolar X-ray source by an observatory satellite.

The MIT gamma-ray instrument obtained the first identification of high-energy cosmic gamma rays emanating from both galactic and extra-galactic sources.

== See also ==
- Orbiting Solar Observatory
- X-ray astronomy
