= HEAO Program =

The High Energy Astronomy Observatory Program was a NASA program of the late 1970s and early 1980s that included a series of three large low-Earth-orbiting spacecraft for X-ray and Gamma-Ray astronomy and Cosmic-Ray investigations. After launch, they were denoted HEAO 1, HEAO 2 (also known as The Einstein Observatory), and HEAO 3, respectively. The large (~3000 kg) satellites were 3-axis stabilized to arc-minute accuracy, with fixed solar panels. All three observatories were launched from Cape Canaveral, Florida on Atlas-Centaur SLV-3D launch vehicles into near-circular orbits with initial altitudes slightly above 500 km.

== HEAO 1 ==
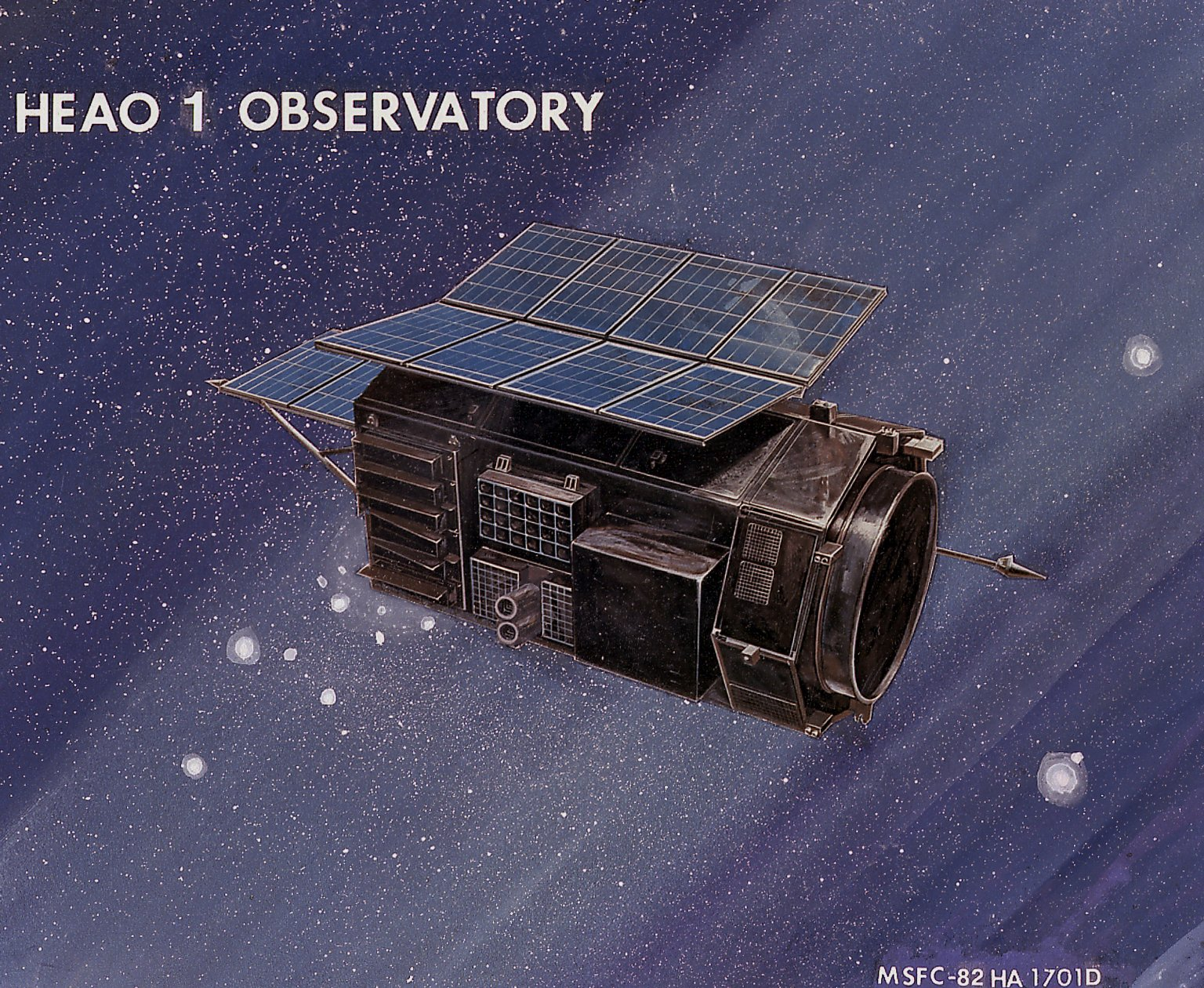
HEAO 1

HEAO 1, launched August 12, 1977, was a sky survey mission that included four large X-ray and gamma-ray astronomy instruments, known as A1, A2, A3, and A4, respectively. Inclination was about 22.7 degrees. It re-entered the Earth's atmosphere and burned up on March 15, 1979.

- The A1, or Large-Area Sky Survey (LASS) instrument, was managed by the Naval Research Laboratory and used large proportional counters to cover the 0.25 to 25 keV energy range.
- The A2, or Cosmic X-ray Experiment (CXE), from the Goddard Space Flight Center, covered the 2-60 keV energy range with high spatial and spectral resolution.
- The A3, or Modulation Collimator (MC) instrument, provided high-precision positions of X-ray sources, accurate enough to permit follow-up observations to identify optical and radio counterparts. It was provided by the Center for Astrophysics (Smithsonian Astrophysical Observatory and the Harvard College Observatory, SAO/HCO).
- The A4, Hard X-ray / Low Energy Gamma-ray experiment, used scintillation counters to cover the energy range from about 20 keV to 10 MeV. It was provided and managed by the University of California at San Diego, in collaboration with MIT.

== HEAO 2 (Einstein Observatory) ==
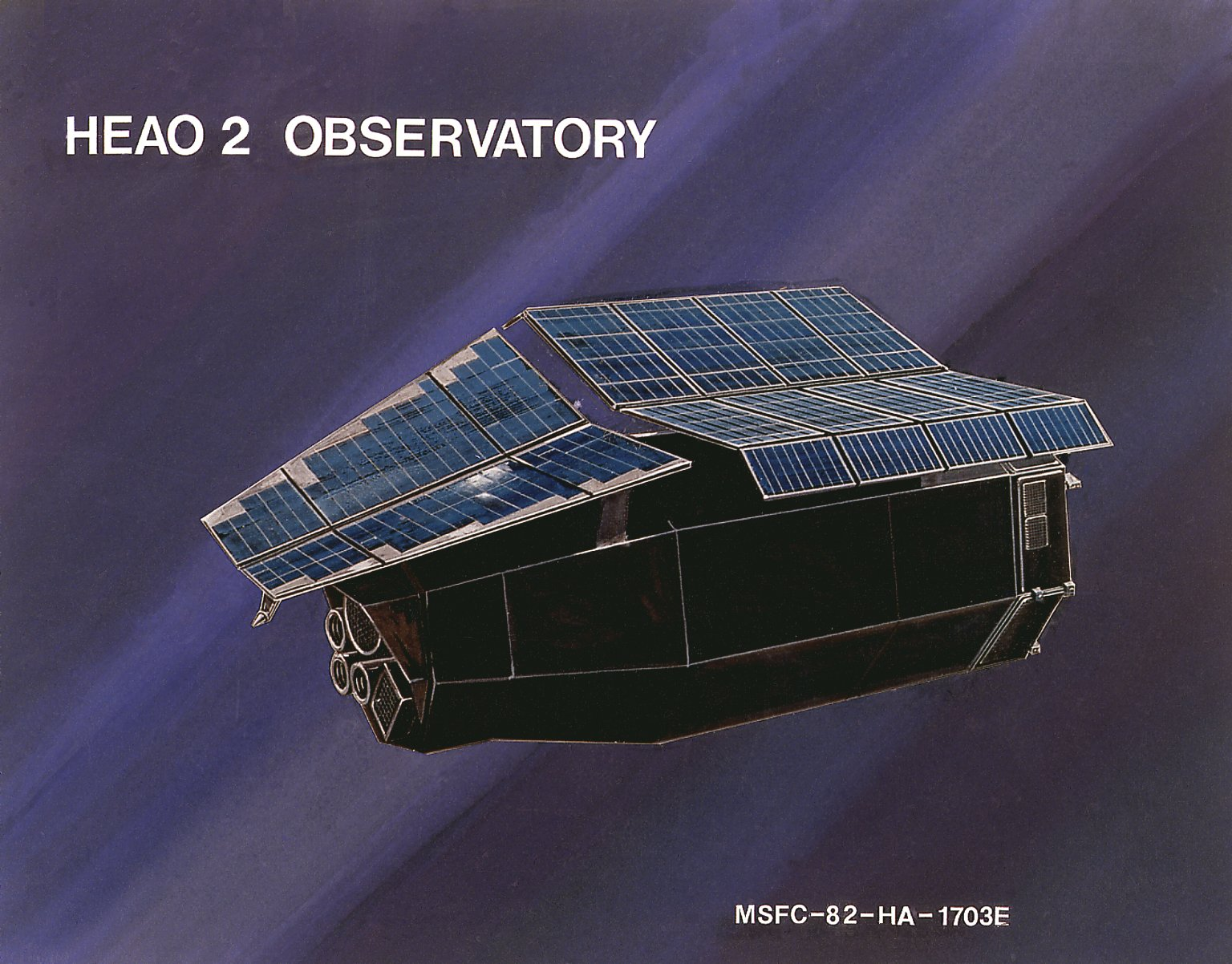
Einstein Observatory

HEAO 2, more commonly known as the Einstein Observatory, launched 13 November 1978 into a 23.5 deg inclination orbit. It carried a single large grazing-incidence focusing X-ray telescope, providing unprecedented levels of sensitivity (hundreds of times better than previously achieved) and arc-second angular resolution for pointed observations of known objects, and operated over the 0.2 to 3.5 keV energy range. HEAO 2 differed from HEAO 1 and HEAO 3 in that it was used for pointed, deep, small-field-of-view observations rather than sky-survey studies.

A suite of four focal plane instruments were provided:

- HRI, or High Resolution Imaging camera, 0.15-3 keV.
- IPC, or Imaging Proportional Counter, 0.4 to 4 keV.
- SSS, or Solid State Spectrometer, 0.5 to 4.5 keV.
- FPCS, or Bragg Focal Plane Crystal Spectrometer,

as well as a 1-20 keV Monitor Proportional Counter (MPC), a Broad Band Filter Spectrometer (BBFS), and an objective grating spectrometer (OGS). The observatory re-entered the Earth's atmosphere and burned up on March 25, 1982.

== HEAO 3 ==
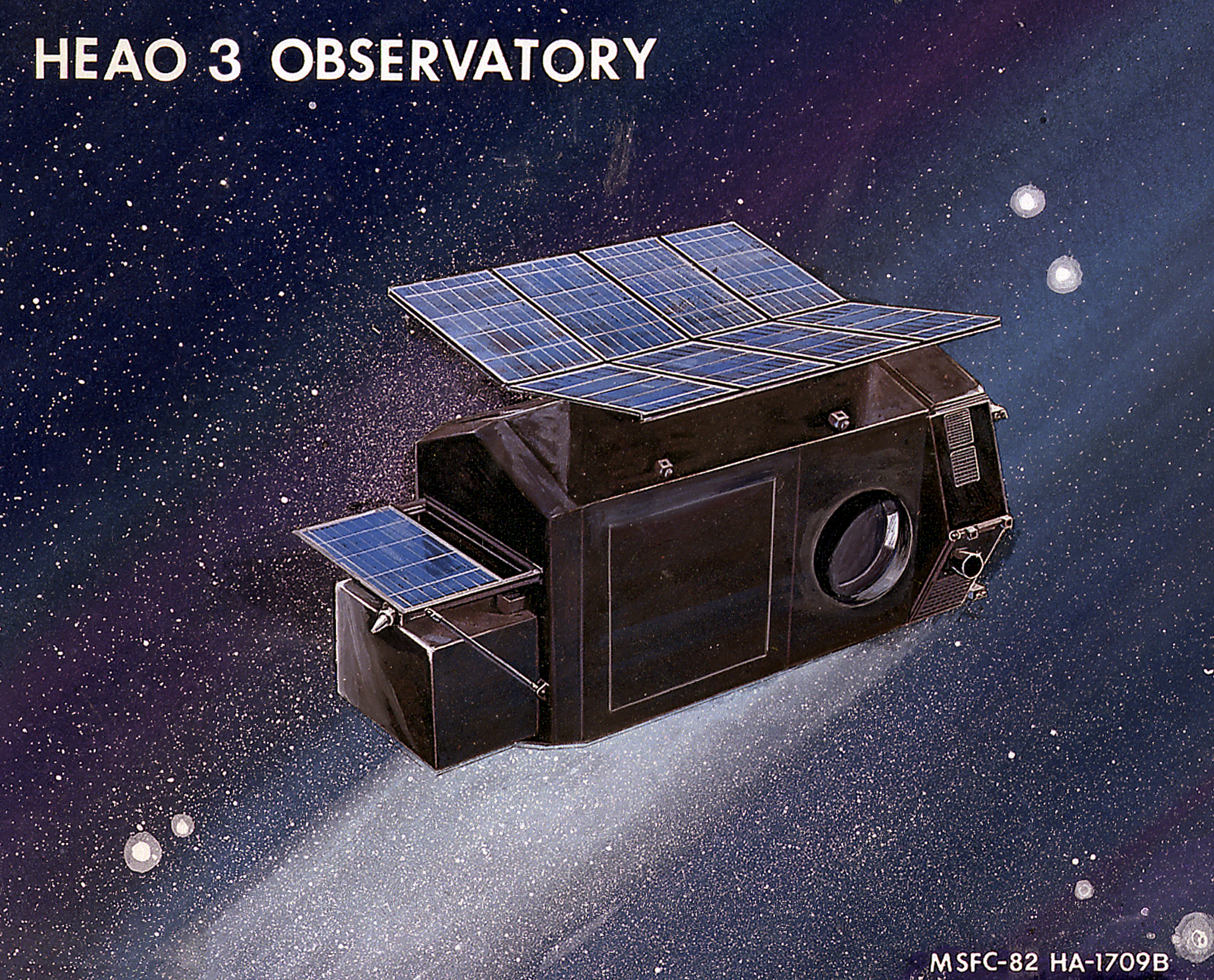
HEAO 3

HEAO 3, launched on 20 September 1979 into a 43.6-degree inclination orbit, carried three experiments, known as C1, C2, and C3. The first was a cryogenically cooled germanium (Ge) high-resolution gamma-ray spectrometer, while the C2 and C3 experiments were large cosmic-ray instruments. The satellite re-entered the Earth's atmosphere and burned up on December 7, 1981.

== Program ==
The experiment designations A1, A2, A3, A4, for HEAO A, thru C1, C2, C3 for HEAO C, were most common before launch, but also often appear in the later scientific literature. The overall HEAO program was managed out of NASA's Marshall Space Flight Center in Huntsville, AL. NASA Program Manager was Mr. Richard E. Halpern; NASA Program Scientist was Dr. Albert G. Opp. All three satellites were built by TRW Systems of Redondo Beach, California, who won the Nelson P. Jackson Aerospace Award for their work. The total program cost was roughly $250 million.
