= OSO 7 =

Solar space observatory

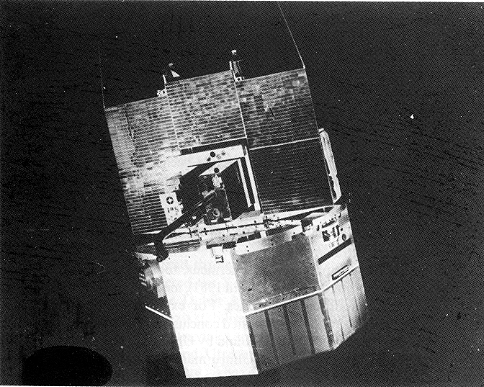
- The OSO 7 satellite, like the other Orbiting Solar Observatory missions, was primarily a solar observatory designed to point a battery of UV and X-ray telescopes at the Sun from a stabilized "sail" pointing platform mounted on a rotating cylindrical "wheel".
- Operator: NASA
- COSPAR ID: 1971-083A
- SATCAT no.: 05491
- Mission duration: 3 years

Spacecraft properties
- Manufacturer: Ball Brothers Research Corporation (BBRC)
- Launch mass: 635 kilograms (1,400 lb)

Start of mission
- Launch date: 29 September 1971, 09:50:00 UTC
- Rocket: Delta-N
- Launch site: Cape Kennedy LC-17A

End of mission
- Decay date: 9 July 1974

Orbital parameters
- Reference system: Geocentric
- Eccentricity: 0.018376
- Perigee altitude: 321.0 kilometers (199.5 mi)
- Apogee altitude: 572.0 kilometers (355.4 mi)
- Inclination: 33.10 degrees
- Period: 93.20 minutes
- Mean motion: 15.45
- Epoch: 29 September 1971, 05:50:00 UTC

OSO 7 or Orbiting Solar Observatory 7 (NSSDC ID: 1971-083A), before launch known as OSO H is the seventh in the series of American Orbiting Solar Observatory satellites launched by NASA between 1962 and 1975. OSO 7 was launched from Cape Kennedy (now Cape Canaveral) on 29 September 1971 by a Delta N rocket into a 33.1° inclination, low-Earth (initially 321 by 572 km) orbit, and re-entered the Earth's atmosphere on 9 July 1974. It was built by the Ball Brothers Research Corporation (BBRC), now known as Ball Aerospace, in Boulder Colorado.

While the basic design of all the OSO satellites was similar, the OSO 7 was larger [total spacecraft mass was 635 kg (1397 lb)] than the OSO 1 through OSO 6, with a larger squared-off solar array in the non-rotating "Sail", and a deeper rotating section, the "Wheel".

== Sail instruments ==
The "Sail" portion of the spacecraft, which was stabilized to face the Sun in all the OSO series satellites, carried two instruments on OSO 7, which continuously viewed the Sun during orbit day. These were:

- The GSFC X-Ray and EUV Spectroheliograph (covering the wavelength range 2 to 400 Å), under the direction of P.I. Dr. Werner M. Neupert of the NASA GSFC which imaged the Sun in the Extreme Ultraviolet and soft X-ray bands, to determine the temperature and distribution of matter in the corona above active regions and during solar flares.
- The NRL White-Light Coronagraph and Extreme Ultraviolet Corona Experiment, directed by Dr. Richard Tousey of the US Naval Research Laboratory, which imaged the while light corona, using an occulting disk, allowing comparison between the structure of the corona and the active regions on the solar surface.

== Wheel instruments ==
The rotating "Wheel" component of the spacecraft, which provided overall gyroscopic stability to the satellite, carried four instruments, which looked radially outwards and scanned across the Sun every 2 seconds. Two of these were solar-observing instruments, and the other two were cosmic X-ray instruments:

- UCSD Hard Solar X-Ray Monitoring instrument, P.I. Prof. Laurence E. Peterson. covered the 2–300 keV energy range using proportional counter and NaI scintillator detectors, plus three small charged-particle detectors for monitoring the local radiation environment.
- UNH Solar Gamma-Ray Monitor. P.I. Prof. Edward Chupp, observed 0.3–10 MeV solar flare gamma rays with a NaI(Tl) scintillation spectrometer in a CsI(Na) active anti-coincidence shield.
- MIT Cosmic X-Ray Experiment, P.I. Prof. George W. Clarke, observed cosmic X-ray sources in the range 1.5 to 9 Å. This instrument used proportional counters to observe cosmic X-ray sources in the 1 to 60 keV range, in five broad logarithmically spaced energy bands, with about 1° angular resolution.
- UCSD Cosmic X-ray Experiment, P.I. Prof. Laurence E. Peterson. This instrument, which had a field of view (FWHM) about 6°, looked out perpendicular to the Wheel spin axis, sweeping a great circle on the sky every 2 seconds. As the Wheel spin axis moved to keep the Sail instruments pointed at the Sun, it scanned the whole sky every 6 months. It featured a 1 cm thick NaI(Tl) scintillation detector that covered the energy range from ~7 keV to ~500 keV in 126 PHA channels, with an effective area of 100 cm^{2} at the lower energies. The detector was enclosed in a thick CsI(Na) anti-coincidence scintillation shield with 10 holes bored through it, which defined the optical field of view of the detector. Events were individually recorded and telemetered, with time and pulse height tagged for each, at a maximal rate of 3.2 per second.

== Scientific results ==
Among the notable scientific results from OSO 7 were:

- All-sky hard X-ray surveys by the MIT and UCSD cosmic instruments.
- The first observation of solar gamma ray (γ) line emission, due to electron/positron annihilation at 511 keV, from solar flares in early August 1972, by the UNH spectrometer. Long legendary in NASA due to the hazard to human spaceflight, it would have incurred a potentially fatal radiation dose had astronauts been in space at time and outside the Earth's protective magnetosphere (as is the case during much of a lunar Apollo mission).
- The first clear detection of a coronal mass ejection (CME), by the NRL instrument.
- Observations of the hard X-ray spectra of the AGN NGC 4151 and Cen A
- Position and spectral variability of the 14 May 1972 cosmic gamma-ray burst

== Near loss at launch ==
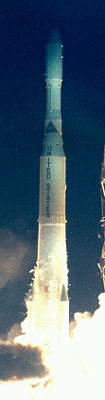
Launch of Delta 85 with OSO 7 and ERS 33

The OSO 7 was nearly lost at launch, due to a loss of hydraulic pressure in the second-stage guidance control system ~7 seconds prior to second-stage engine cutoff. The nominal plan was for the spacecraft to be separated from the second stage with the spin axis normal to the Sun direction, so that the sail could be oriented to the Sun, allowing the batteries to be fully charged on orbit. As it was, the orbit was slightly eccentric instead of circular, and the orientation of the spacecraft immediately after launch was unknown, so that the sail could not acquire Sun lock. The spacecraft was launched with its batteries fully charged, giving approximately 12 hours for the controllers, directed by NASA's John Thole, to recover before the spacecraft lost power and command ability. Several hours passed as engineers attempted to interpret the signal strength from the tumbling spacecraft in terms of its transmitting antenna pattern. Finally, an hour or two before the end, Thole decided to abandon caution and "start slewing", and by luck and skill, control was regained.

Because the resulting orbital apogee was ~572 km instead of the planned ~350 km for the nominal circular orbit, several times each day OSO 7 passed fairly deeply into the Van Allen radiation belts, so that bombardment by high energy protons made it somewhat radioactive. The activity then decayed slowly during other times of the day. The complexly varying instrument internal radioactivity complicated the analysis of data from the sensitive X-ray and gamma-ray instruments on board.

== P78-1 ==
The flight spare for OSO H was later acquired by the U.S. Air Force, modified and re-instrumented, and then launched in 1979 as P78-1 (also known as Solwind), the satellite which was shot down by the USAF in a successful anti-satellite missile test in 1985. OSO 7 and P78-1 were not identical in appearance, but more similar to each other than either were to the earlier OSO 1 through OSO 6 spacecraft, or to the final OSO 8.
