= High Energy Astronomy Observatory 1 =

X-ray telescope launched in 1977

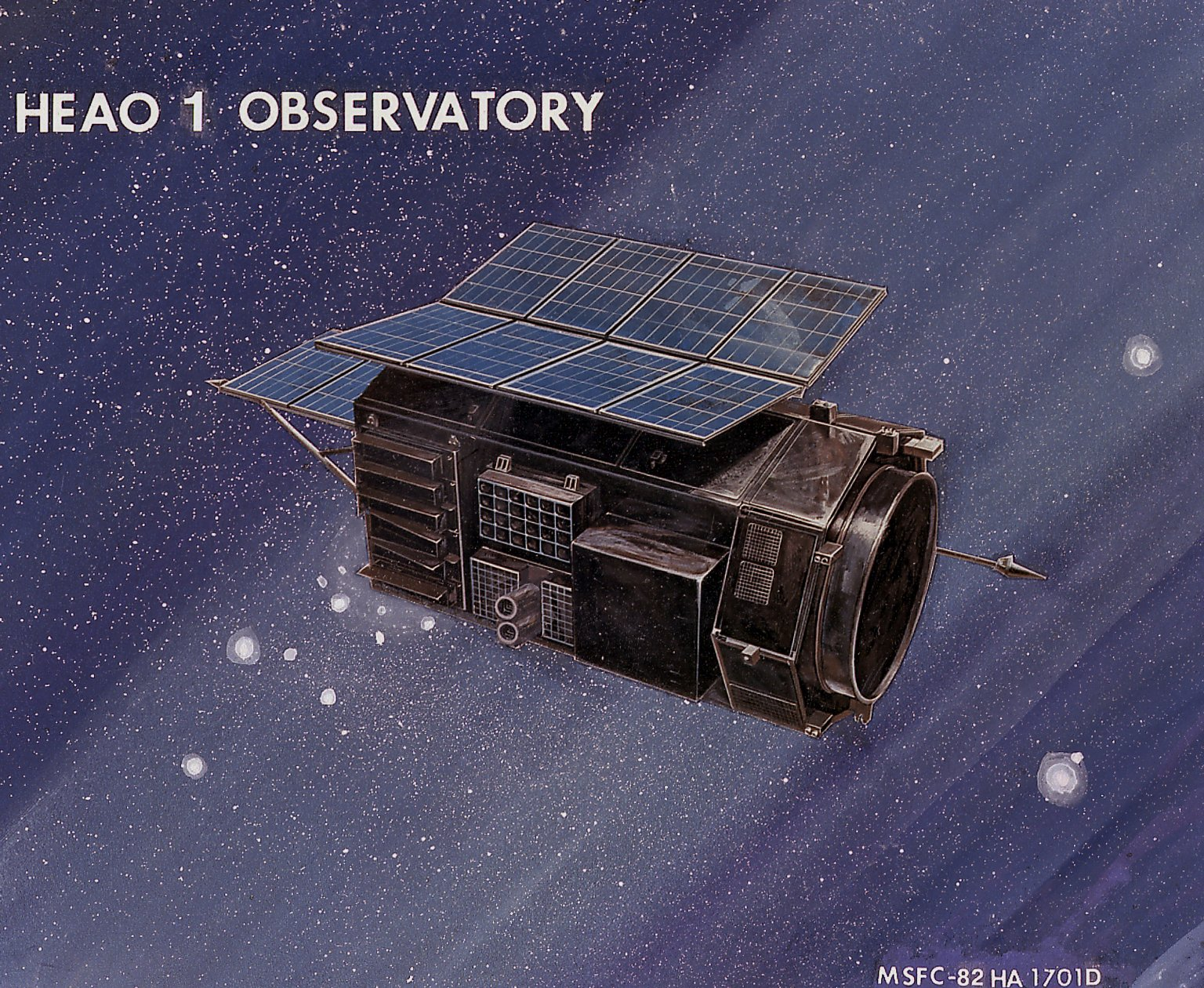
- Names: HEAO-1, HEAO-A
- Mission type: orbiter
- Operator: NASA
- COSPAR ID: 1977-075A
- SATCAT no.: 10217
- Mission duration: 1 year, 7 months and 2 days

Spacecraft properties
- Manufacturer: TRW
- Payload mass: 2,551.9 kg (5,626 lb)
- Dimensions: height:5.68 m (18.6 ft) radius: 2.67 m (8 ft 9 in)

Start of mission
- Launch date: 12 August 1977
- Rocket: Atlas Centaur
- Launch site: CCAFS LC-36B

End of mission
- Deactivated: 9 January 1979
- Decay date: 14 March 1979

Orbital parameters
- Eccentricity: 0
- Perigee altitude: 432 km (268 mi)
- Apogee altitude: 432 km (268 mi)
- Inclination: 23°
- Period: 93.5 min
- Epoch: 13 August 1977 00:00:00 UTC

HEAO-1 was an X-ray telescope launched in 1977. HEAO-1 surveyed the sky in the X-ray portion of the electromagnetic spectrum (0.2 keV – 10 MeV), providing nearly constant monitoring of X-ray sources near the ecliptic poles and more detailed studies of a number of objects by observations lasting 3–6 hours. It was the first of NASA's three High Energy Astronomy Observatories, launched on August 12, 1977 aboard an Atlas rocket with a Centaur upper stage, operated until 9 January 1979. During that time, it scanned the X-ray sky almost three times

HEAO included four X-ray and gamma-ray astronomy instruments, known as A1, A2, A3, and A4, respectively (before launch, HEAO 1 was known as HEAO A). The orbital inclination was about 22.7 degrees. HEAO 1 re-entered the Earth's atmosphere on 15 March 1979.

== A1: Large-Area Sky Survey instrument ==
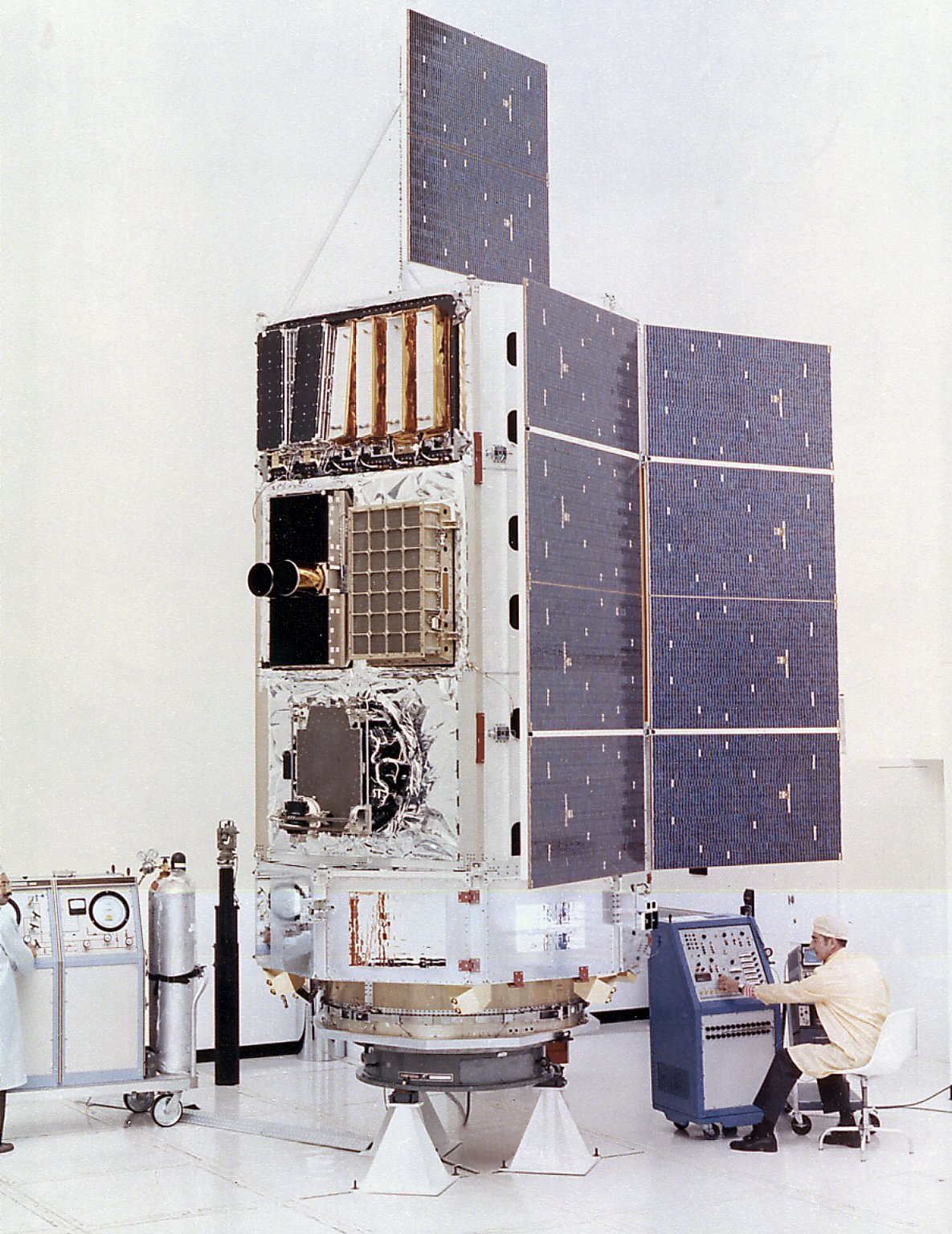
HEAO-1 being assembled at TRW Systems

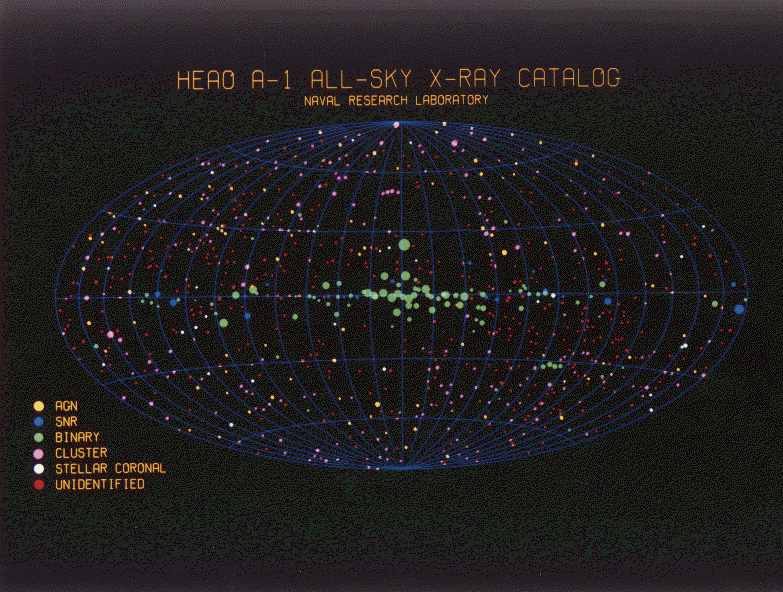
The all sky x-ray catalog

The A1, or Large-Area Sky Survey (LASS) instrument, covered the 0.25–25 keV energy range, using seven large proportional counters. It was designed, operated, and managed at the Naval Research Laboratory (NRL) under the direction of Principal Investigator Dr. Herbert D. Friedman, and the prime contractor was TRW. The HEAO A-1 X-Ray Source Catalog included 842 discrete X-ray sources.

== A2: Cosmic X-ray Experiment ==
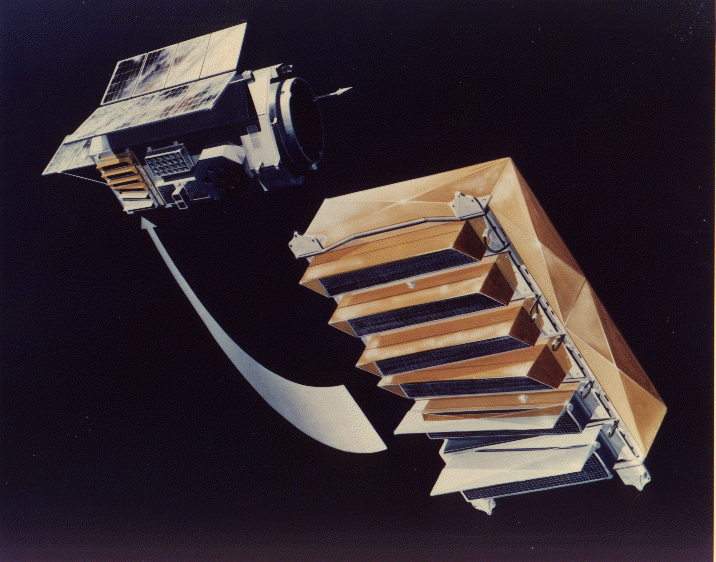
The A2 experiment

The A2, or Cosmic X-ray Experiment (CXE), from the Goddard Space Flight Center, covered the 2–60 keV energy range with high spatial and spectral resolution. The Principal Investigators were Dr. Elihu A. Boldt and Dr. Gordon P. Garmire.

== A3: Modulation Collimator instrument ==
The A3, or Modulation Collimator (MC) instrument, provided high-precision positions of X-ray sources, accurate enough to permit follow-up observations to identify optical and radio counterparts. It was provided by the Center for Astrophysics (Smithsonian Astrophysical Observatory and the Harvard College Observatory, SAO/HCO). Principal Investigators were Dr. Daniel A. Schwartz of SAO and Dr. Hale V. Bradt of MIT.

== A4: Hard X-Ray / Low-Energy Gamma-ray experiment ==
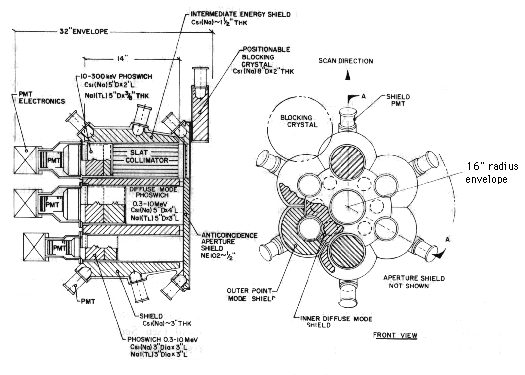
Diagram of the A4 instrument

The A4, or Hard X-ray / Low Energy Gamma-ray Experiment, used sodium iodide (NaI) scintillation counters to cover the energy range from about 20 keV to 10 MeV. It consisted of seven clustered modules, of three distinct designs, in a roughly hexagonal array. Each detector was actively shielded by surrounding CsI scintillators, in active-anti-coincidence, so that an extraneous particle or gamma-ray event from the side or rear would be vetoed electronically, and rejected. (It was discovered in early balloon flight by experimenters in the 1960s that passive collimators or shields, made of materials such as lead, actually increase the undesired background rate, due to the intense showers of secondary particles and photons produced by the extremely high energy (GeV) particles characteristic of the space radiation environment.) A plastic anti-coincidence scintillation shield, essentially transparent to gamma-ray photons, protected the detectors from high-energy charged particles entering from the front.

For all seven modules, the unwanted background effects of particles or photons entering from the rear was suppressed by a "phoswich" design, in which the active NaI detecting element was optically coupled to a layer of CsI on its rear surface, which was in turn optically coupled to a single photomultiplier tube for each of the seven units. Because the NaI has a much faster response time (~0.25 μs) than the CsI (~1 μs), electronic pulse shape discriminators could distinguish good events in the NaI from mixed events accompanied by a simultaneous interaction in the CsI.

The largest, or High Energy Detector (HED), occupied the central position and covered the upper range from ~120 keV to 10 MeV, with a field-of-view (FOV) collimated to 37° FWHM. Its NaI detector was 5 inches (13 cm) in diameter by 3 inches (7.6 cm) thick. The extreme penetrating power of photons in this energy range made it necessary to operate the HED in electronic anti-coincidence with the surrounding CsI and also the six other detectors of the hexagon.

Two Low Energy Detectors (LEDs) were located in positions 180° apart on opposite side of the hexagon. They had thin ~3 mm thick NaI detectors, also 5 inches (13 cm) in diameter, covering the energy range from ~10–200 keV. Their FOV was defined to fan-shaped beams of 1.7° x 20° FWHM by passive, parallel slat-plate collimators. The slats of the two LEDs were inclined to ±30° to the nominal HEAO scanning direction, crossing each other at 60°. Thus, working together, they covered a wide field of view, but could localize celestial sources with a precision determined by their 1.7° narrow fields.

The four Medium Energy Detectors (MEDs), with a nominal energy range of 80 keV — 3 MeV, had 3 inches (7.6 cm) dia by 1 inch (2.5 cm) thick NaI detector crystals, and occupied the four remaining positions in the hexagon of modules. They had circular FOVs with a 17° FWHM.

The primary data from A4 consisted of "event-by-event" telemetry, listing each good (i.e., un-vetoed) event in the NaI detectors. The experiment had the flexibility to tag each event with its pulse height (proportional to its energy), and a one or two byte time tag, allowing precision timing of objects such as gamma-ray bursts and pulsars.

Results of the experiment included a catalog of the positions and intensities of hard X-ray (10–200 keV) sources, a strong observational basis for extremely strong magnetic fields (of order 10^{13} G) on the rotating neutron stars associated with Her X-1 and 4U 0115+634, a definitive diffuse component spectrum between 13 and 200 keV, discovery of the power-law shape of the Cygnus X-1 power density spectrum, and discovery of slow intensity cycles in the X-Ray sources SMC X-1 and LMC X-4, resulting in approximately 15 Ph.D theses and ~100 scientific publications.

The A4 instrument was provided and managed by the University of California at San Diego, under the direction of Prof. Laurence E. Peterson, in collaboration with the X-ray group at MIT, where the initial A4 data reduction was performed under the direction of Prof. Walter H. G. Lewin.

== See also ==
- Einstein Observatory (HEAO 2)
- HEAO Program
- High Energy Astronomy Observatory 3
- Timeline of artificial satellites and space probes
