= Orbiting Solar Observatory =

Series of American solar space observatories

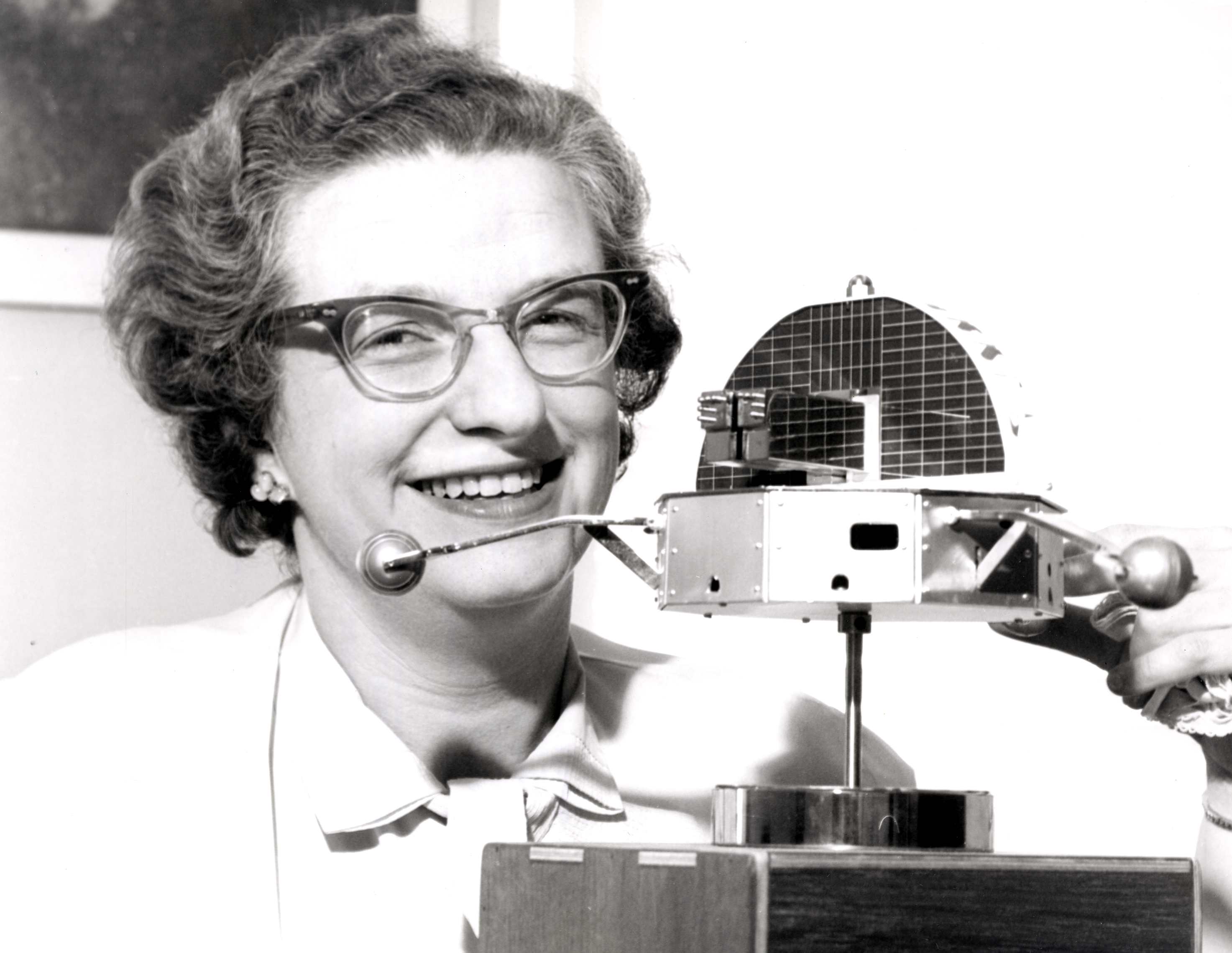
Dr. Nancy Roman with a model of OSO 1 (1962)

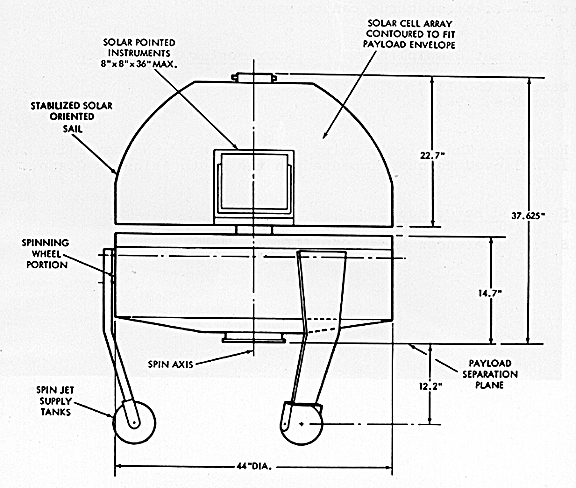
OSO 1 diagram

The Orbiting Solar Observatory (abbreviated OSO) Program was the name of a series of American space telescopes primarily intended to study the Sun, though they also included important non-solar experiments. Eight were launched successfully into low Earth orbit by NASA between 1962 and 1975 using Delta rockets. Their primary mission was to observe an 11-year sun spot cycle in UV and X-ray spectra.

The initial seven (OSO 1–7) were built by Ball Aerospace, then known as Ball Brothers Research Corporation (BBRC), in Boulder, Colorado. OSO 8 was built by Hughes Space and Communications Company, in Culver City, California.

== History ==
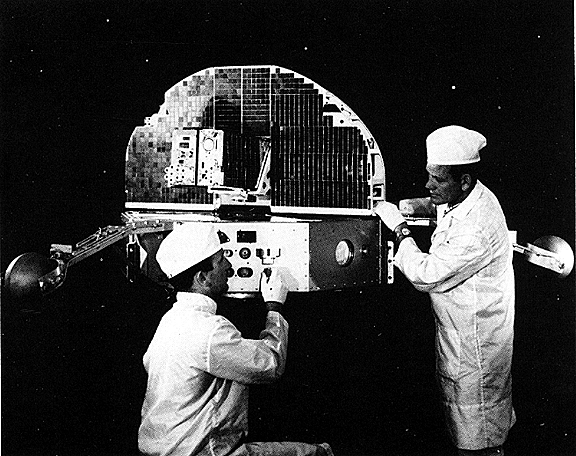
The OSO 2 (OSO B) satellite

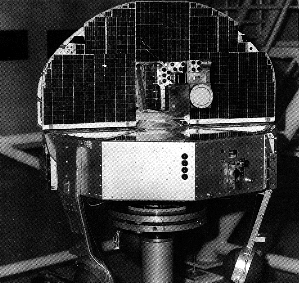
OSO 3 (OSO E1)

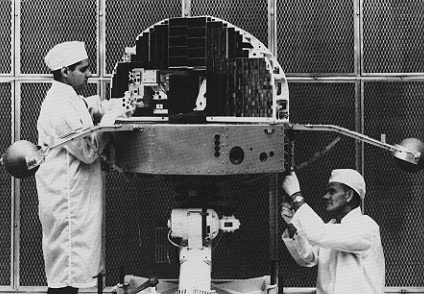
OSO 4 (OSO D)

Nancy Roman oversaw the development of the Orbiting Solar Observatory program from 1961 to 1963.

The basic design of the entire series featured a rotating section, the "Wheel", to provide gyroscopic stability. A second section, the "Sail", was driven electrically against the Wheel's rotation, and stabilized to point at the Sun. The Sail carried pointed solar instruments, and also the array of solar photovoltaic cells which powered the spacecraft. The critical bearing between the Wheel and the Sail was a major feature of the design, as it had to operate smoothly for months in the hard vacuum of space without normal lubrication. It also carried both the power from the Sail and the data from the pointed solar instruments to the Wheel, where most of the spacecraft functions were located. Additional science instruments could also be located in the Wheel, generally looking out on a rotating radius vector which scanned the sky, and also across the Sun, every few seconds.

OSO 1 (OSO A) was launched on March 7, 1962.

OSO B suffered an incident during integration and checkout activities on 14 April 1964. The satellite was inside the Spin Test Facility at Cape Canaveral attached to the third stage of its Delta C booster when a technician accidentally ignited the booster through static electricity. The third-stage motor activated, launched itself and the satellite into the roof, and ricocheted into a corner of the facility until burning out. Three technicians were burned to death. The satellite, although damaged, was able to be repaired using a combination of prototype parts, spare flight parts and new components. It was launched ten months later on 3 February 1965 and was designated OSO 2 (OSO B2) on orbit.

OSO C never made it to orbit. Liftoff took place on 25 August 1965 and all went well through the second stage burn. During the coasting phase prior to third stage separation, its rocket motor ignited prematurely. This registered on ground readouts as an attitude disturbance followed by loss of second stage telemetry, and although the third stage managed to separate itself, it suffered from an 18% drop in thrust. The OSO spacecraft could not attain orbital velocity and instead fell back into the atmosphere and burned up. The failure was suspected to have been caused by a modification to the igniter mechanism in the third stage after some minor technical difficulties experienced on the previous Delta C launch (TIROS 10 on July 2).

OSO 3 (OSO E1) was launched on March 8, 1967.

== List of OSO telescopes ==
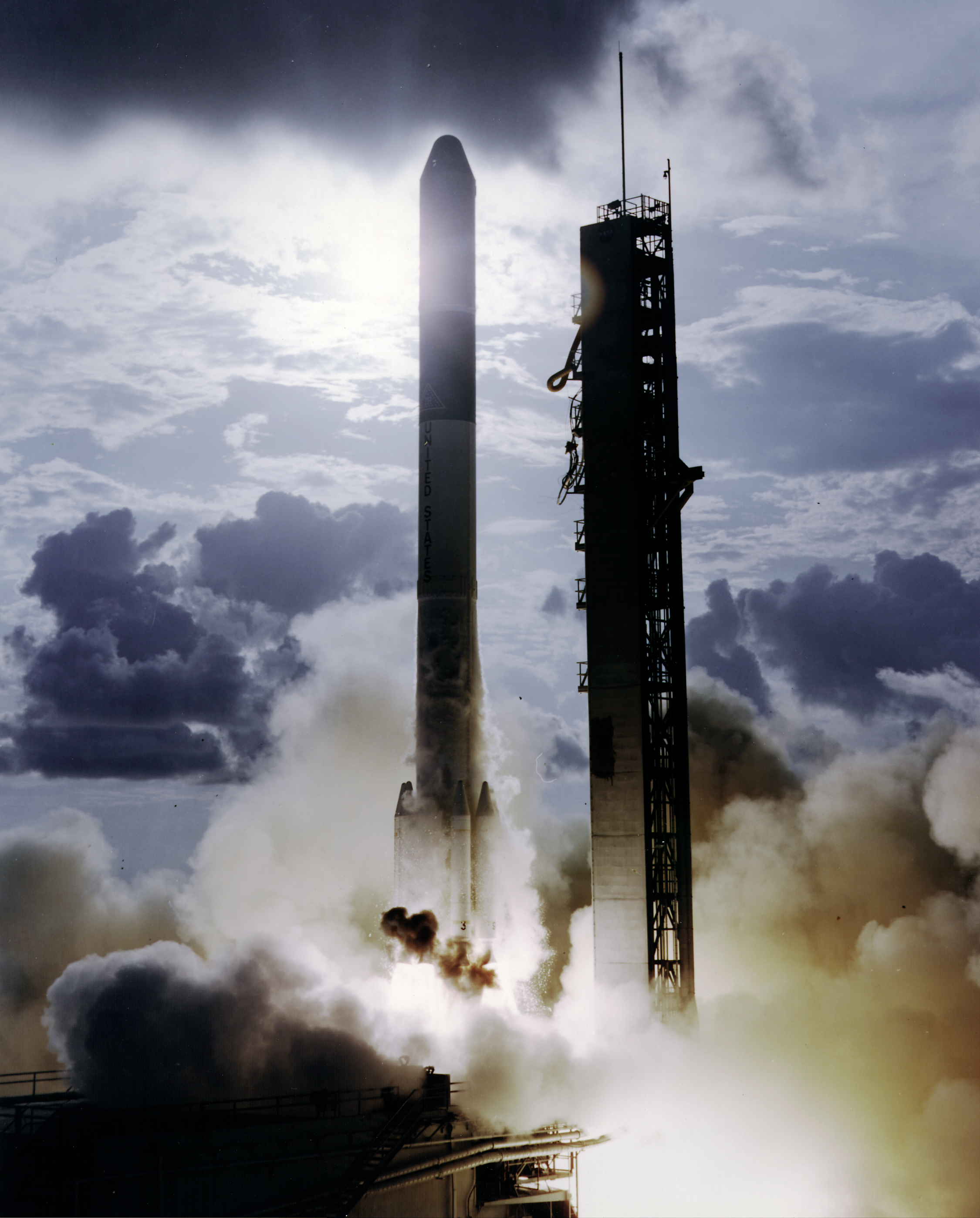
A Delta rocket launching OSO 8 on 21 June 1975, at Cape Canaveral, Florida

Eight OSO telescopes were launched from 1962 to 1975.

Designation	Launch Date	Re-entry date	Notable results
OSO 1 (OSO A)	7 March 1962	7 October 1981	
OSO 2 (OSO B2)	3 February 1965	8 August 1989	
OSO 3 (OSO E1)	8 March 1967	4 April 1982	Observed solar flares from the Sun, as well as a flare from Scorpius X-1
OSO 4 (OSO D)	18 October 1967	14 June 1982	
OSO 5 (OSO F)	22 January 1969	2 April 1984	Measured diffuse background X-ray radiation from 14-200 keV
OSO 6 (OSO G)	9 August 1969	7 March 1981	Observed three instances of hard X-ray coincidences with gamma ray bursts.
OSO 7 (OSO H)	29 September 1971	8 July 1974	Observed solar flares in the gamma ray spectrum. Collected data allowed for identification of Vela X-1 as a High-mass X-ray binary.
OSO 8 (OSO I)	21 June 1975	8 July 1986	Found an iron emission line in the X-ray spectrum of a galaxy cluster.

== Further developments ==
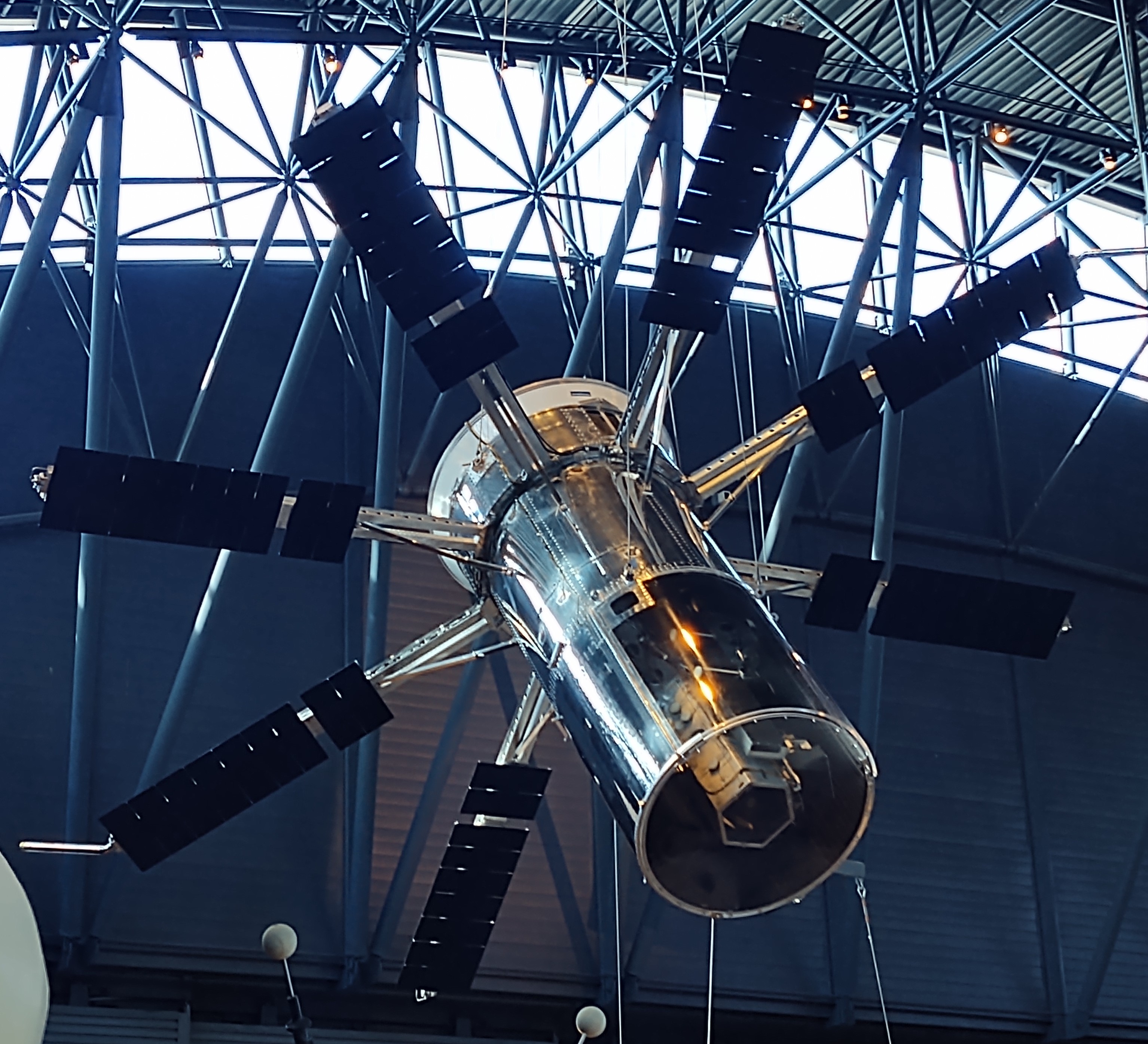
Engineering model of the Advanced Orbiting Solar Observatory

The Advanced Orbiting Solar Observatory (AOSO) program was developed in the mid 1960s as a more advanced version of the OSO series. Conceived as a polar-orbiting satellite system, these spacecraft would continuously monitor the Sun and surrounding environment with detectors and electronic imaging ranging from x-rays to visual light. Due to budget constraints, the AOSO program was cancelled in 1965. Instead, it was replaced by the OSO-I, OSO-J and OSO-K satellites. Only OSO-I, which became OSO 8, was ever launched.

Another satellite using the Orbiting Solar Observatory platform was developed and launched: the Solwind satellite. It was launched February 24, 1979. It was operated by the DoD Space Test Program. It was destroyed September 13, 1985 on an ASAT missile test.

== See also ==
- Timeline of artificial satellites and space probes
