= X-ray star =

X-ray star may refer to:

- Be/X-ray binary, a class of high-mass X-ray binaries that consist of a Be star and a neutron star
- X-ray binary, a class of binary stars that are luminous in X-rays
- X-ray burster, a class of X-ray binary stars exhibiting periodic and rapid increases in luminosity that peak in the X-ray regime of the electromagnetic spectrum
- X-ray pulsar, a class of astronomical objects that are X-ray sources displaying strict periodic variations in X-ray intensity

== See also ==
- X-ray astronomy
