= Small Astronomy Satellite 3 =

NASA space observatory

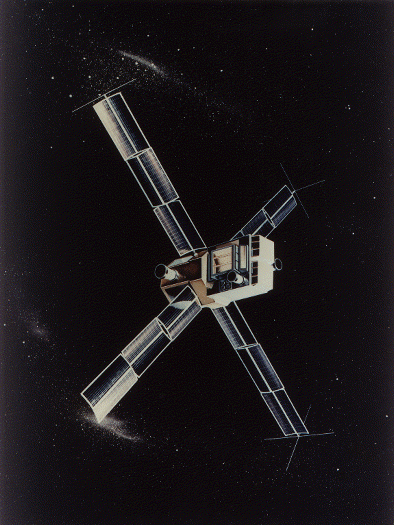
- Small Astronomy Satellite 3
- Names: Explorer 53; SAS-C; Small Astronomy Satellite-3
- Mission type: X-ray astronomy
- Operator: NASA
- COSPAR ID: 1975-037A
- SATCAT no.: 07788
- Mission duration: 4 years

Spacecraft properties
- Manufacturer: APL · Johns Hopkins University
- Launch mass: 196.7 kg (434 lb)
- Power: 65.0 watts

Start of mission
- Launch date: 7 May 1975, 22:45:01 UTC
- Rocket: Scout F-1 (S194C)
- Launch site: San Marco platform

End of mission
- Decay date: 9 April 1979

Orbital parameters
- Reference system: Geocentric
- Regime: Low Earth orbit
- Perigee altitude: 509.00 km (316.28 mi)
- Apogee altitude: 516.00 km (320.63 mi)
- Inclination: 3.00°
- Period: 94.90 minutes
- Revolution no.: 21935

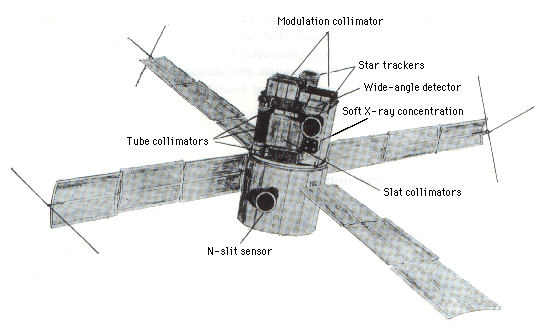
SAS 3 spacecraft as it might have appeared deployed on orbit. The nominal spin axis, or +z axis, points to the upper right, with the RMC and one-star tracker for attitude determination. The remaining instruments and a second star tracker point out of the image toward the viewer. The four solar panels charged batteries during orbit day.

The Small Astronomy Satellite 3 (SAS 3, also known as SAS-C before launch) (Explorer 53) was a NASA X-ray astronomy space telescope. It functioned from 7 May 1975 to 9 April 1979. It covered the X-ray range with four experiments on board. The satellite, built by the Johns Hopkins University Applied Physics Laboratory (APL), was proposed and operated by MIT's Center for Space Research (CSR). It was launched on a Scout vehicle from the Italian San Marco platform (Broglio Space Center) near Malindi, Kenya, into a low-Earth, nearly equatorial orbit. It was also known as Explorer 53, as part of NASA's Explorer program.

The spacecraft was 3-axis stabilized with a momentum wheel that was used to establish stability about the nominal rotation, or Z-axis. The orientation of the Z-axis could be altered over a period of hours using magnetic torque coils that interacted with the Earth's magnetic field. Solar panels charged batteries during the daylight portion of each orbit so that SAS 3 had essentially no expendables to limit its lifetime beyond the life of the tape recorders, batteries, and orbital drag. The spacecraft typically operated in a rotating mode, spinning at one revolution per 95-minute orbit, so that the LEDs, tube and slat collimator experiments, which looked out along the Y-axis, could view and scan the sky almost continuously. The rotation could also be stopped, allowing extended (up to 30 minutes) pointed observations of selected sources by the Y-axis instruments. Data were recorded on board by magnetic tape recorders, and played back during station passes every orbit.

SAS 3 was commanded from the NASA Goddard Space Flight Center (GSFC) in Greenbelt, Maryland, but data was transmitted by modem to MIT for scientific analysis, where scientific and technical staff were on duty 24 hours a day. The data from each orbit were subjected to quick-look scientific analysis at MIT before the next orbital station passed, so the science operational plan could be altered by telephoned instruction from MIT to GSFC in order to study targets in near real-time.

== Launch ==
The spacecraft was launched from the San Marco platform off the coast of Kenya, Africa, into a near-circular, near-equatorial orbit. This spacecraft contained four instruments: the Extragalactic Experiment, the Galactic Monitor Experiment, the Scorpio Monitor Experiment and the Galactic Absorption Experiment. In the orbital configuration, the spacecraft was 145.2 cm (57.2 in) high and the tip-to-tip dimension was 470.3 cm (185.2 in). Four solar paddles were used in conjunction with a 12-cell nickel–cadmium battery to provide power over the entire orbit. The spacecraft was stabilized along the Z-axis and rotated at about 0.1°/second. Changes to the spin-axis orientation were by ground command, either delayed or in real-time. The spacecraft could be made to move back and forth ± 2.5° across a selected source along the X-axis at 0.01°/second. The experiments looked along the Z-axis of the spacecraft, perpendicular to it, and at an angle.

== Objectives ==
The major scientific objectives of the mission were:

1. Determine bright X-ray source locations to an accuracy of 15 arcseconds;
2. Study selected sources over the energy range 0.1-55 keV;
3. Continuously search the sky for X-ray novae, flares, and other transient phenomena.

Explorer 53 (SAS-C) was a small spacecraft whose objectives were to survey the celestial sphere for sources radiating in the X-ray, gamma ray, ultraviolet and other spectral regions. The primary missions of Explorer 53 were to measure the X-ray emission of discrete extragalactic sources, to monitor the intensity and spectra of galactic X-ray sources from 0.2 to 60-keV, and to monitor the X-ray intensity of Scorpio X-1.

== Experiments ==
=== Extragalactic Experiment (EGE) ===
This experiment determined the positions of very weak extragalactic X-ray sources. The instrument viewed a 100-sq-degree region of the sky around the direction of the spin axis of the satellite. The nominal targets for a 1-year study were: (1) the Virgo Cluster of galaxies for 4 months, (2) the galactic equator for 2 months, (3) the Andromeda Nebula for 3 months, and (4) the Magellanic Clouds for 3 months. The instrumentation consisted of one 2.5-arc-minutes and one 4.5-arc-minutes Full width at half maximum (FWHM) modulation collimator, as well as proportional counters sensitive over the energy range from 1.5 to 10-keV. The effective area of each collimator was about 225 cm^{2}. The aspect system provided information on the orientation of the collimators to an accuracy of 15-arc-seconds.

=== Galactic Absorption Experiment (GAE) ===
The density and distribution of interstellar matter were determined by measuring the variation in the intensity of the low-energy diffuse X-ray background as a function of galactic latitude. A 1-micrometer polypropylene window proportional counter was used for the 0.1- to 0.4-keV and 0.4- to 1.0-keV energy ranges, while a 2-micrometer titanium window counter covered the energy range from 0.3 to 0.5 keV. In addition, two 1-mm beryllium window counters were used for the 1.0- to 10-keV energy range. The collimators in this experiment had fields of view of 3° for the 1-micrometer counter, 2° for the 2-mm counter, and 2° for the 1-mm counters.

=== Galactic Monitor Experiment (GME) ===
The objectives of this experiment were to locate galactic X-ray sources to 15 arc-seconds and to monitor these sources for intensity variations. The source positions were determined with the use of the modulation collimators of the Extragalactic Experiment during the nominal 2-month observation of the galactic equator. The monitoring of the X-ray sky was accomplished by the use of three slat collimators. One collimator, 1° by 70° FWHM, was oriented perpendicular to the equatorial plane of the satellite, while the other two, each 0.5° by 45° FWHM, were oriented 30° above and 30° below the first. The detector behind each collimator was a proportional counter, sensitive from 1.5 to 13 keV, with an effective area of about 100 cm^{2}. The 1.0° collimator had an additional counter of the same area, sensitive from 8 to 50 keV. Three lines of position were obtained for any given source when the satellite was being spun at a steady rotation of 4 arc-minutes/seconds about the Z-axis.

=== Scorpio Monitor Experiment (SME) ===
A 12° by 50° FWHM slat collimator was oriented with its long axis perpendicular to the satellite spin axis such that a given point in the sky could be monitored for about 25% of a rotation. This collimator was inclined by 31° with respect to the equatorial plane of the satellite so that Scorpio X-1 was observed while the Z-axis was oriented to the Virgo Cluster of galaxies. The detectors used in this experiment were proportional counters with 1-mm beryllium windows. The energy range was from 1.0 to 60-keV, and the total effective area was about 40-cm^{2}.

== Research results ==
SAS 3 was especially productive due to its flexibility and rapid responsiveness. Among its most important results were:

- Shortly after the discovery of the first X-ray burster by the ANS, an intense period of burst source discovery by SAS 3 quickly led to the discovery and characterization of about a dozen additional objects, including the famous Rapid Burster, MXB1730-335. These observations established the identification of bursting X-ray sources with neutron star binary systems;
- The RMC was the first instrument to routinely provide X-ray positions that were sufficiently precise to allow follow-up by optical observatories to establish X-ray/optical counterparts, even in crowded regions near the galactic plane. Roughly 60 positions were obtained with accuracies on the order of 1 arcminute or less. The resulting source identifications helped to connect X-ray astronomy to the main body of stellar astrophysics;
- Discovery of the 3.6 seconds pulsations of the transient neutron star/Be star binary 4U 0115+63., leading to the determination of its orbit and observation of a cyclotron absorption line in its strong magnetic field. Many Be star/neutron star binaries were subsequently discovered as a class of X-ray emitters;
- Discovery of X-ray emission from HZ 43 (an isolated white dwarf), Algol, and from AM Her, the first highly magnetic white dwarf binary system seen in X rays;
- Established the frequent location of X-ray sources near the centers of globular clusters;
- First identification of a QSO through its X-ray emission;
- The soft X-ray instrument established that the 0.10-28 keV diffuse intensity is generally inversely correlated with the neutral H column density, indicating absorption of external diffuse sources by the foreground galactic interstellar medium.

Lead investigators on SAS 3 were MIT professors George W. Clark, Hale V. Bradt, and Walter H. G. Lewin. Other major contributors were Profs Claude R. Canizares and Saul Rappaport, and Drs Jeffrey A. Hoffman, George Ricker, Jeff McClintock, Rodger Doxsey, Garrett Jernigan, Lynn Cominsky, John Doty, and many others, including numerous graduate students.

== See also ==
- Small Astronomy Satellite 1
- Small Astronomy Satellite 2

== Sources ==
- "HEASARC: Observatories - The Third Small Astronomy Satellite (SAS-3)". NASA. Archived from the original on 13 January 2004.
- SAS (Small Astronomy Satellite), The Internet Encyclopedia of Science
