= Intermediate-mass X-ray binary =

Type of binary star

Artist's impression of IMXB GRO J1655–40 during accretion

An intermediate-mass X-ray binary (IMXB) is a type of X-ray binary containing a compact object and an intermediate-mass donor star. Mass ranges differ, but a system with a donor star between ~1-8 solar masses (M_{☉}) is generally considered to be an IMXB. (Note: Proposed ranges include: 1–7 M_{☉} 2.0–10.0 M_{☉} 1–10 M_{☉}) Compared to their low-mass and high-mass counterparts, IMXBs are relatively rare, making up less than 10% of strong X-ray sources observed in the Milky Way galaxy. This may be due to selection effects, as IMXBs are more difficult to detect than LMXBs and HMXBs. However, they are considered to be likely candidates for the progenitors of LMXBs, as mathematical models find them more likely to form and an IMXB origin is consistent with observed data from LMXBs such as Cygnus X-2. In particular, IMXBs may be the progenitors of recycled pulsars and ultracompact X-ray binaries.

== Formation ==
IMXBs form in a manner similar to LMXBs. First, a binary star system forms in which the more-massive (primary) star has a mass greater than 8 M_{☉}. As the primary object evolves, it will fill its Roche lobe and mass transfer between the two stars will begin, which will typically be dynamically unstable due to the high mass ratio between the two stars. The star can also lose mass from stellar wind. Eventually, the primary star will lose its entire envelope of hydrogen, leaving just a hydrogen-depleted core. Ultimately, this core will become unstable due to loss of hydrostatic equilibrium and an inability to fuse elements heavier than iron and will explode in a type Ib or Ic supernova, forming a neutron star or black hole.

== Properties ==
Unlike HMXBs, the donor star in IMXBs is not massive enough to emit significant stellar wind, feeding the compact object. Additionally, because of the high mass ratio between an intermediate-mass star and a typical neutron star, accretion via Roche lobe overflow in NS IMXBs is unstable. The mass transfer period of IMXBs is also relatively short, lasting only thousands of years, and emitted X-rays may be absorbed by the large cloud of gas surrounding the accreting object, making these binaries difficult to detect.

NS IMXBs are candidates for ultraluminous X-ray sources (ULXs), X-ray sources with luminosities above the Eddington luminosity for a typical stellar-mass black hole. ULX IMXBs would accrete at very high rates, potentially causing spin-up of the NS.

== Evolution ==
Due to accretion, the mass of the donor star decreases over time. If this effect is extreme enough, an IMXB may lose enough mass to cross below the IMXB mass threshold, thus becoming an LMXB.

Several simulations of X-ray binary evolution have found that IMXB evolution routes of LMXB formation are both more likely and better explanations of observed LMXB parameters. The formation of LMXBs via IMXB evolution could explain the problem of supernova kicks—in which binary systems remain bound despite the newly-formed compact object receiving a large velocity boost from its supernova explosion—because it is easier for systems with a higher-mass donor star to remain bound.

It has also been suggested that IMXBs may specifically be the progenitors of recycled pulsars and |ultracompact X-ray binaries. In the case of recycled pulsars, IMXB binaries would have higher mass transfer rates over shorter evolution timescales compared to systems that are initially low-mass. They may also experience accretion disk instabilities as the intermediate-mass star loses mass to become a low-mass star, resulting in less mass being accreted onto the neutron star. This could explain the properties of certain observed recycled pulsars such as PSR J1232-6501, PSR J1810-2005, and PSR J1904+0412, which have longer spin periods than most recycled pulsars, suggesting a lesser degree of spin-up from accretion. In the case of UCXBs, the intermediate-mass star is an Ap or Bp star with a very strong magnetic field. This allows magnetic braking to decrease the orbital period to 40–60 minutes within a short enough amount of time for these binaries to be seen in the universe at its current age—For a typical, non-magnetized low-mass star, the time required to reduce the orbital period to such a short duration is often greater than the Hubble time.

== Observation ==
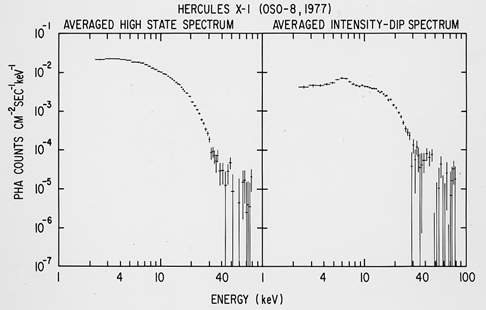
Spectrum of Hercules X-1, the first IMXB to be definitively identified.

Observations of the LMXB Cygnus X-2 sparked further interest in LMXBs in the 1990s and 2000s. Cygnus X-2 hosts a 0.6 M_{☉} donor star, but its luminosity is much higher than what would be expected for a star of that mass. Thus, it is believed to have originally been an IMXB with a mass of 3.5 M_{☉}, which would fit better with the observed luminosity of the star. Before this, the only unambiguously-identified IMXB was Hercules X-1.

== Notable IMXBs ==
- Cygnus X-2 (at time of formation)
- Hercules X-1
- SAX J1819.3−2525 (upper mass range, potentially an HMXB)
- 4U 1210−64
- GRO J1655–40
- 4U 1543–47
- LMC X-3
- V 4642 Sagittarii

== See also ==
- Low-mass X-ray binary
- High-mass X-ray binary
