= Centaurus X-3 =

Binary star with an X-ray pulsar in the constellation Centaurus

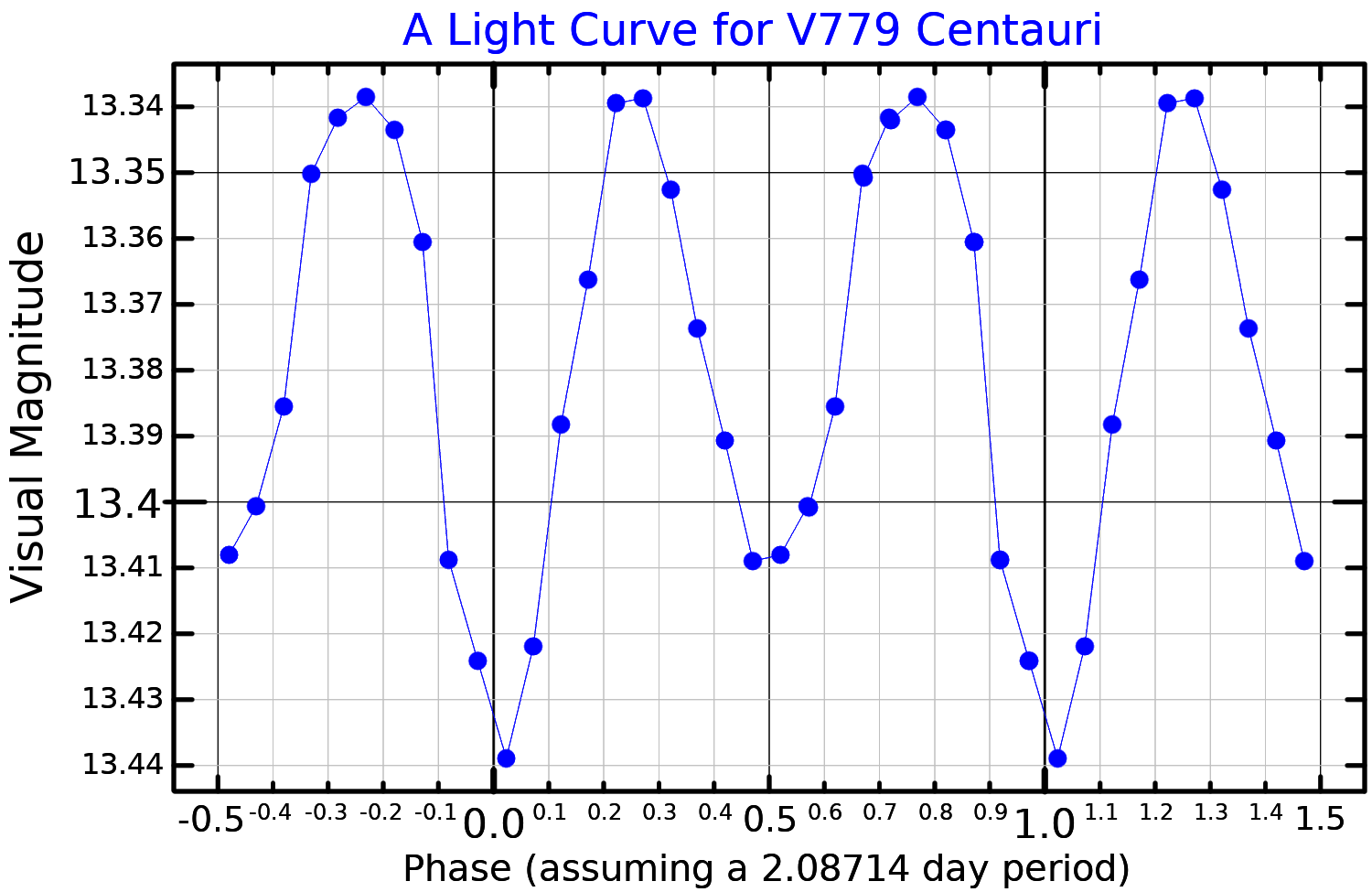
- A visual band light curve for V779 Centauri, adapted from Tjemkes et al. (1986)

Observation data Epoch J2000 Equinox ICRS
- Constellation: Centaurus
- Right ascension: 11^{h} 21^{m} 15.09^{s}
- Declination: −60° 37′ 22.6″
- Apparent magnitude (V): 13.25 (- 13.39) - 13.46

Characteristics
- Spectral type: O6-7 II-III
- Variable type: Ellipsoidal & eclipsing

Astrometry
Proper motion (μ)	RA: −3.121 mas/yr Dec.: +2.331 mas/yr
Parallax (π)	0.1387±0.0112 mas
Distance	24,000 ± 2,000 ly (7,200 ± 600 pc)

Details

Krzemiński's star
Mass	20.5 ± 0.7 M_{☉}
Radius	12 R_{☉}
Luminosity	316,000 L_{☉}
Temperature	39,000 K

X-ray component
Mass	1.21 ± 0.21 M_{☉}
Radius	9.178±0.130 km

Other designations
- V779 Cen, 1RXS J112115.4-603725, 4U 1118–60, AAVSO 1116-60

Database references
SIMBAD	data

Centaurus X-3 (4U 1118–60) is an X-ray pulsar with a period of 4.84 seconds. It was the first X-ray pulsar to be discovered, and the third X-ray source to be discovered in the constellation Centaurus. The system consists of a neutron star orbiting a massive, O-type supergiant star dubbed Krzemiński's star /(k)ʃɛˈmɪnskiz/ after its discoverer, Wojciech Krzemiński. Matter is being accreted from the star onto the neutron star, resulting in X-ray emission.

== History ==
Centaurus X-3 was first observed during experiments of cosmic X-ray sources made on May 18, 1967. These initial X-ray spectrum and location measurements were performed using a sounding rocket. In 1971, further observations were performed with the Uhuru satellite, in the form of twenty-seven 100-second duration sightings. These sightings were found to pulsate with an average period of 4.84 seconds, with a variation in the period of 0.02 seconds. Later, it became clear that the period variations followed a 2.09 day sinusoidal curve around the 4.84 second period. These variations in arrival time of the pulses were attributed to the Doppler effect caused by orbital motion of the source, and were therefore evidence for the binary nature of Centaurus X-3.

Despite detailed data from the Uhuru satellite as to the orbital period of the binary, and the pulsation period in the X-ray band as well as the minimum mass of the occulting star, the optical component remained undiscovered for three years. This was partly because Cen X-3 lies in the plane of the Galaxy in the direction of the Carina Spiral Arm, and so observations were forced to differentiate among dozens of faint objects. Centaurus X-3 was finally identified with a faint, heavily reddened variable star lying just outside the error box predicted by Uhuru observations. The visible star was later named after its discoverer, Poland astronomer Wojtek Krzemiński.

Centaurus X-3 was the first sources observed by the Russian x-ray telescope ART-XC. An image was released with the title "First Light Image of the Spektr-RG Observatory", showing the source imaged by the individual telescopes of ART-XC, as well as the light curve of Centaurus X-3 folded at its pulse period of 4.8s.

== System ==
Centaurus X-3 is located in the galactic plane about 5.7 kiloparsecs away, towards the direction of the Carina–Sagittarius Arm, and is a member of an occulting spectroscopic binary system. The visible component is Krzemiński's Star, a supergiant; the X-ray component is a rotating, magnetized neutron star.

=== X-ray component ===
The X-ray emission is fueled by the accretion of matter from the distended atmosphere of the blue giant falling through the inner Lagrangian point, L1. The overflowing gas probably forms an accretion disc and ultimately spirals inwards and falls onto the neutron star, releasing gravitational potential energy. The magnetic field of the neutron star channels the inflowing gas onto localized hot spots on the neutron star surface where the X-ray emission occurs.

The neutron star is regularly eclipsed by its giant companion every 2.1 days; these regular X-ray eclipses last approximately 1/4 the orbital period. There are also sporadic X-ray off durations.

The spin period history of Centaurus X-3 shows a spin-up trend that is very prominent in the long-term decrease in its pulse period. This spin-up was first noted in Centaurus X-3 and Hercules X-1 and is now noted in other X-ray pulsars. The most feasible way of explaining the origin of this effect is by a torque exerted on the neutron star by accreting material.

=== Krzemiński's Star ===
Krzemiński's Star is a 20.5 solar mass (M_{☉}), slightly evolved hot massive star with a radius of 12 R_{☉} and spectral type O6-7 II-III.

There is little doubt as to the correctness of the optical candidate, since it is in apparent agreement with the period and phase of Cen X-3, and exhibits the same similarity in its double wave and amplitude light curve seen in other known massive binary systems. The double wave ellipsoidal light variations are produced by a tidally deformed giant that nearly fills its Roche lobe. The visible component corresponds to an OB II class star, comparable with the mass derived from X-ray data, consistent with the minimum radius that has been fixed by X-ray eclipse duration.

== See also ==
- X-ray pulsar
- List of X-ray pulsars
