= LMC X-4 =

X-ray binary in the Large Magellanic Cloud

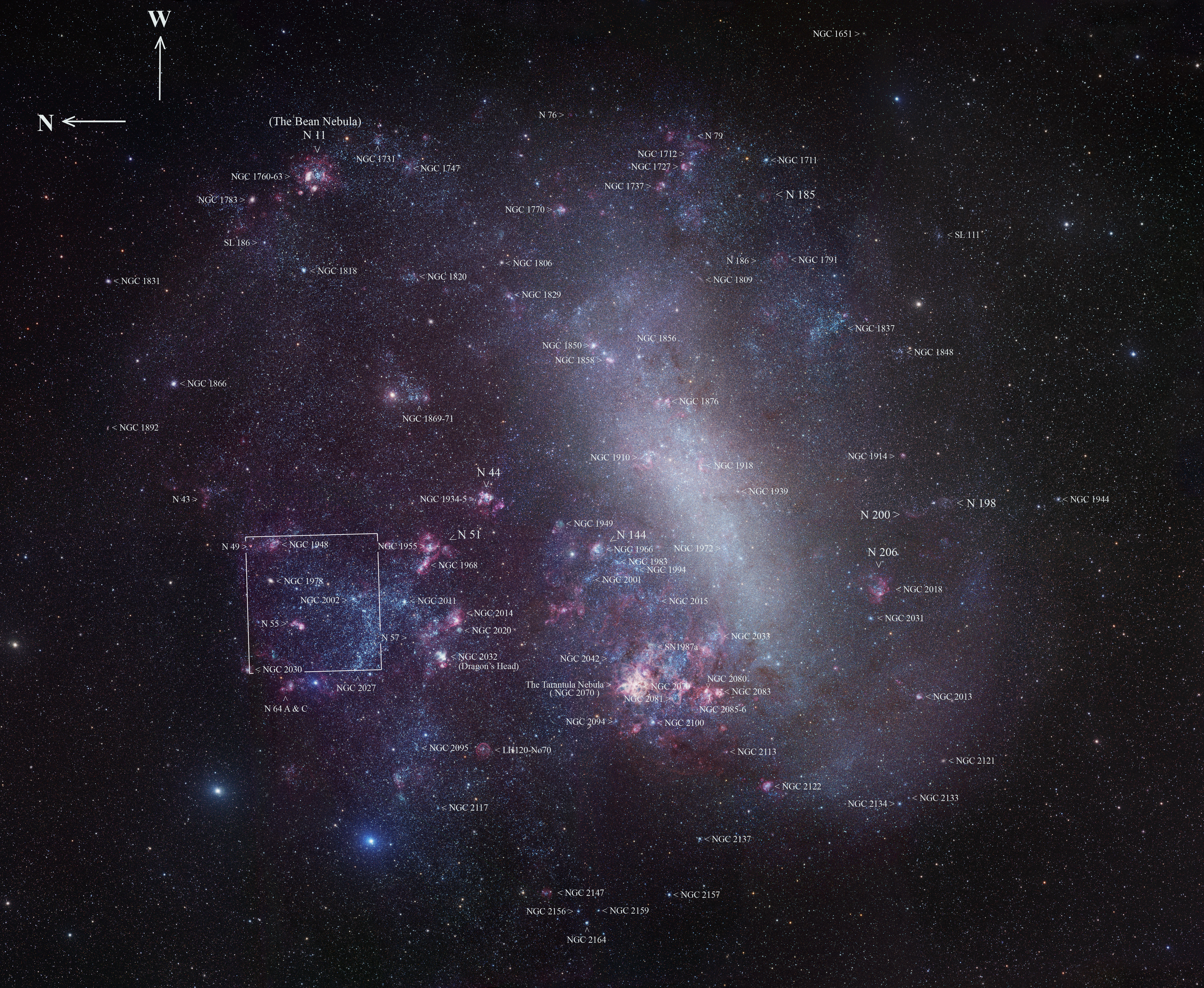

Observation data Epoch J2000.0 Equinox ICRS
- Constellation: Dorado
- Right ascension: 05^{h} 32^{m} 49.56^{s}
- Declination: −66° 22′ 13.2″

Characteristics
- Evolutionary stage: Blue supergiant + Pulsar
- Spectral type: O8III

Astrometry
| Radial velocity (R_{v}) | 284 km/s |
| Proper motion (μ) | RA: 1.757 mas/yr Dec.: 0.407 mas/yr |
| Distance | 163,000 ly |

Orbit
| Primary | Supergiant star |
| Name | A |
| Period (P) | 1.40830 ± 0.0005 days |

Details

A
| Mass | 25 M_{☉} |

B
| Mass | 1.4 M_{☉} |

Other designations
- LMC X-4, 2MASS J05324953-6622132, SWIFT J0532.5-6623A, TIC 276861105, Gaia DR3 4660300345280168192

Database references
| SIMBAD | data |

LMC X-4 is an eclipsing high-mass X-ray binary (HMXB) pulsar system located in the Large Magellanic Cloud (LMC), a satellite galaxy of the Milky Way approximately 163,000 light-years away. Discovered in 1972 by the Uhuru X-ray observatory, it consists of a neutron star and a massive companion star, exhibiting periodic X-ray eclipses and long-term intensity variations.

== Charecterstics ==
=== Components ===
LMC X-4 comprises a neutron star with a spin period of 13.5 seconds and an estimated mass of approximately 1.4 solar masses, though earlier studies suggested a range of 2–4 solar masses. The companion is an O7 III-V (or O8 III) star with a mass of about 25 solar masses, nearly filling its Roche lobe, and a visual magnitude of ~14.0. The system's high X-ray luminosity is likely powered by a combination of stellar wind accretion and possible Roche-lobe overflow.

=== Orbital Parameters ===
The binary system has an orbital period of 1.40830 ± 0.0005 days and exhibits a super-orbital period of approximately 30.5 days, attributed to accretion disc precession. Long-term observations indicate orbital decay with a period derivative on a timescale of ~0.8 million years and evidence of a second derivative on a 55-year timescale, derived from data spanning over 4,600 orbits.

=== X-ray Emission ===
The X-ray emission of LMC X-4 is characterized by a power-law spectrum with a photon index of 0.7–1.0, a high-energy cutoff, and an iron emission line. The iron line's equivalent width varies significantly during low-intensity states but remains stable in high states, showing similarities to the HMXB Her X-1, though without the variable absorption column density. The system displays X-ray flares and quasi-periodic oscillations (QPOs) at frequencies around 74 mHz and 20–30 mHz, detected by XMM-Newton. Periodic X-ray eclipses have been instrumental in refining orbital parameters.

== Evolution ==
Recent simulations suggest that LMC X-4 may evolve into a Thorne–Żytkow object, a theoretical star with a neutron star core enveloped by a massive stellar companion, potentially linked to ultra-long gamma-ray bursts. Its study provides insights into accretion processes, orbital dynamics, and the evolution of massive binary systems.
