= IGR J17329-2731 =

X-ray source

Observation data Epoch J2000.0 Equinox ICRS
- Constellation: Ophiuchus
- Right ascension: 17^{h} 32^{m} 50.28^{s}
- Declination: −27° 30′ 04.9″
Distance	8800+11000 −3900 ly (2700+3400 −1200 pc)
Spectral type	M III (Note: The donor star is described as a "late M giant")

Database references
SIMBAD	data

IGR J17329-2731 as described by European Space Agency astronomers is a single faint transient X-ray source (ATel #10644) observed with Swift/XRT on 16 August 2017 from 2:26 to 2:45 UTC with an effective exposure of time of 1 ks. It was detected within the positional uncertainty provided by INTEGRAL IBIS imagery. It was described as the birth of a symbiotic X-ray binary, a "first" in the lifecycle of an interacting binary star, or a zombie neutron star brought back to life by its neighboring red giant. When first described in 2017, it was seen as an X-ray flare "from an unknown source" in the direction from the galactic (Milky Way) center.

== See also ==
- IGR J11014-6103
- IGR J17091-3624
