= List of X-ray pulsars =

This is a partial list of known accretion-powered pulsars, as of 1997.

== LMXB ==
Low-mass binaries	Spin period (sec)	Orbital period (days)	Companion (MK type)
GRO J1744-28	0.467	11.8	unknown
4U 1626-67	7.66	0.0289	KZ TrA (low-mass dwarf)
4U 1728-247 (GX 1+4)	120	unknown	V2116 Oph (M6 III)
SAX J1808.4–3658	0.00249	0.0838	(Brown dwarf)
SAX J1748.9–2021	0.00226	0.365	(Main-sequence star)
XTE J1751–305	0.00230	0.0292	(He or C/O white dwarf)
XTE J0929–314	0.00541	0.0303	(He white dwarf)
XTE J1807–294	0.00526	0.0278	(C/O white dwarf)
XTE J1814–338	0.00318	0.178	(Main-sequence star)
IGR J00291+5934	0.00167	0.103	(Brown dwarf)
HETE J1900.1–2455	0.00265	0.0583	(Brown dwarf)
Swift J1749.4–2807	0.00193	0.368	(Main-sequence star)
Swift J1756.9–2508	0.00549	0.0380	(He white dwarf)
Aquila X-1	0.00182	0.790	(K6-M0)
NGC 6440 X-2	0.00485	0.0396	(He white dwarf)
IGR J17511–3057	0.00408	0.145	(Main-sequence star)
IGR J17498–2921	0.00249	0.160	(Main-sequence star)
IGR J18245–2452	0.00394	0.460	(Main-sequence star)
MAXI J0911–655	0.00294	0.0308	(He white dwarf?)
IGR J17062–6143	0.00611	0.0263	(He white dwarf?)
IGR J16597–3704	0.00952	0.0321	(He white dwarf)
IGR J17379–3747	0.00214	0.0783	(Brown dwarf)
IGR J17591–2342	0.00190	0.790	(Main-sequence star)
MAXI J1816–195	0.00189	0.200	
SRGA J144459.2–604207	0.00223	0.218	(M?)

== IMXB ==
Intermediate-mass binaries	Spin period (sec)	Orbital period (days)	Companion (MK type)
Hercules X-1 (Her X-1)	1.24	1.7	HZ Her (A9-B)

== HMXB ==
High-mass binaries	Spin period (sec)	Orbital period (days)	Companion (MK type)
SMC X-1	0.717	3.89	Sk 160 (B0 I)
Centaurus X-3 (Cen X-3)	4.82	2.09	V779 Cen (O6-8f)
RX J0648.1-4419	13.2	1.54	HD 49798 (O6p)
LMC X-4	13.5	1.41	Sk-Ph (O7 III-V)
OAO 1657-415	37.7	10.4	(Ofpe/WN9)
Vela X-1	283	8.96	HD 77581 (B0.5 Ib)
1E 1145.1-6141	297	unknown	V830 Cen (B2 Iae)
4U 1907+09	438	8.38	(B I)
4U 1538-52	530	3.73	QV Nor (B0 Iab)
GX 301-2	681	41.5	Way 977BI.5 Ia)

== BeXB ==
Transient Be star binary systems	Spin period (sec)	Orbital period (days)	Companion (MK type)
A0538-67	0.069	16.7	(B2 III-IVe)
4U 0115+63	3.61	24.3	V635 Cas (Be)
V0332+53	4.37	34.2	BQ Cam (Be)
2S 1417-624	17.6	42.1	(OBe)
EXO 2030+375	41.7	46.0	(Be)
GRO J1008-57	93.5	~248	(Be)
A0535+26	105	110	HDE 245770 (09.7 IIe)
GX 304-1	272	133(?)	V850 Cen (B2 Vne)
4U 1145-619	292	187	Hen 715 (BI Vne)
A1118-616	405	unknown	He 3-640 (O9.5 III-Ve)
4U 0352+309	835	unknown	X Per (O9 III-Ve)
RX J0146.9+6121	1413	unknown	LS I+61 235 (B5 IIIe)
RX J0209.6-7427	9.28	unknown	(Be)
SWIFT J0243.6+6124	9.8	28.9	(O9.5 Ve)

== See also ==
- Lists of astronomical objects
