= X Persei =

Variable star in the constellation Perseus

- Location of X Per (circled in red, in the middle of the green dash)

Observation data Epoch J2000.0 Equinox ICRS
- Constellation: Perseus
- Right ascension: 03^{h} 55^{m} 23.0779^{s}
- Declination: +31° 02′ 45.046″
- Apparent magnitude (V): 6.03 - 7.00

Characteristics
- Spectral type: O9.5IIIe-B0Ve
- U−B color index: −0.790
- B−V color index: +0.137
- Variable type: γ Cas + X-ray pulsar

Astrometry
Radial velocity (R_{v})	−50.00 km/s
Proper motion (μ)	RA: −1.397 mas/yr Dec.: −2.254 mas/yr
Parallax (π)	1.2342±0.0562 mas
Distance	2,600 ± 100 ly (810 ± 40 pc)
Absolute magnitude (M_{V})	−3.47

Orbit
Period (P)	250.3 days
Semi-major axis (a)	2.2 AU
Eccentricity (e)	0.111±0.018
Inclination (i)	23 - 30°
Periastron epoch (T)	51353±7
Argument of periastron (ω) (secondary)	288±9°

Details

Donor
Mass	15.5 M_{☉}
Radius	6.5 R_{☉}
Luminosity	29,000 L_{☉}
Surface gravity (log g)	4.0 cgs
Temperature	29,500 K
Rotational velocity (v sin i)	215 km/s
Age	5 Myr

Neutron Star
Mass	1.61 ± 0.05 M_{☉}
Rotation	837.6712 ± 0.0003 s

Other designations
- X Persei, HR 1209, HIP 18350, HD 24534, BD+30°591, WDS J03554+3103, AAVSO 0349+30, 4U 0352+309, 2MASS J03552309+3102449, Gaia DR2 168450545792009600

Database references
SIMBAD	data

X Persei is a high-mass X-ray binary system located in the constellation Perseus, approximately 950 parsecs away. It is catalogued as 4U 0352+309 in the final Uhuru catalog of X-ray objects.

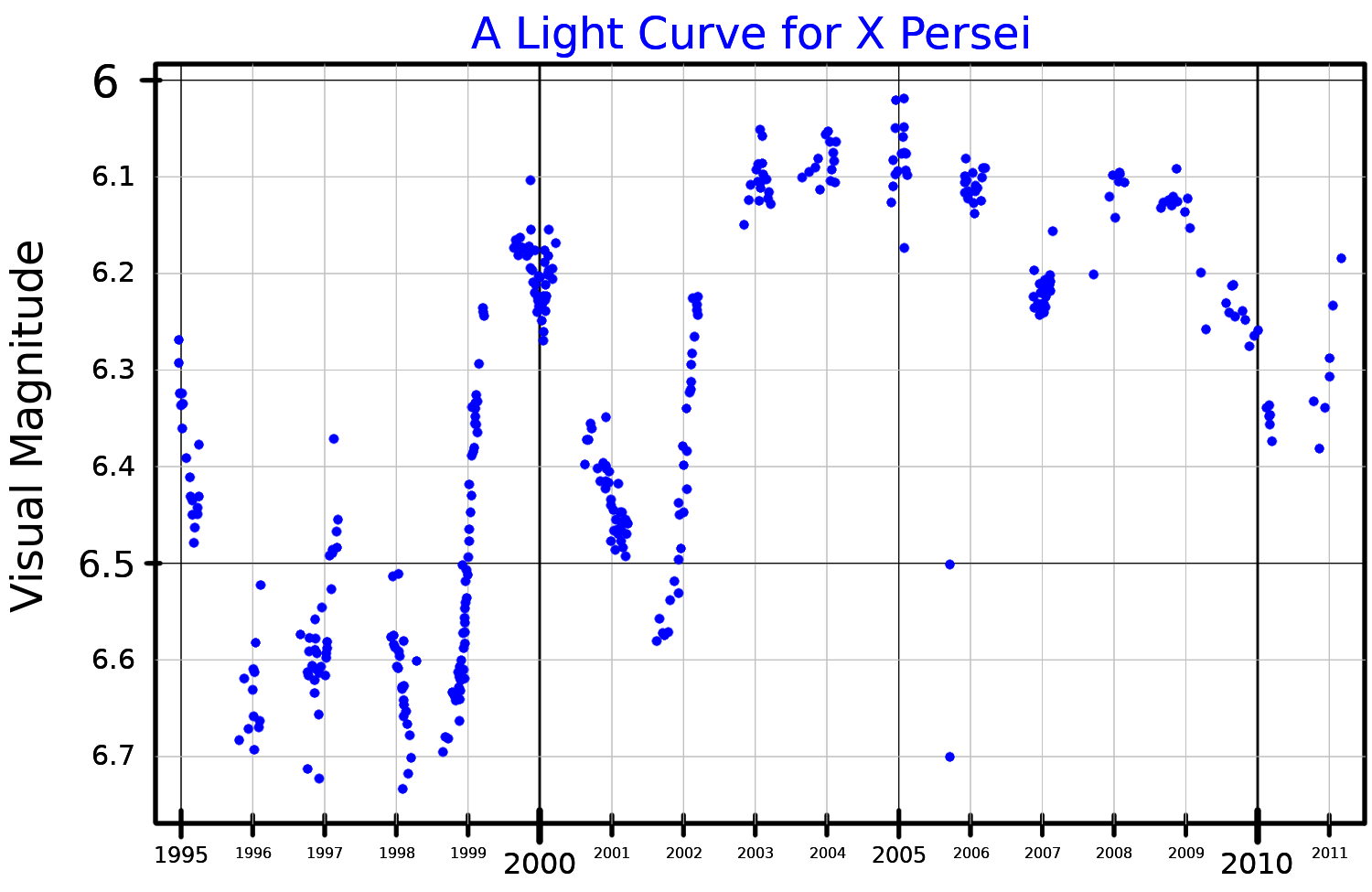
A visual band light curve for X Persei, adapted from Lutovinov et al. (2012)

The conventional star component of X Persei has been classified either as an O-type giant or a B-type main sequence star. It is a Be star, rotating rapidly, and at times surrounded by a disk of expelled material. This qualifies it as a Gamma Cassiopeiae variable, and the visual range is magnitude 6 - 7. In 1989 and 1990, the spectrum of X Persei changed from a Be star to a normal B class star while it faded significantly. This appears to have been caused by the loss of the excretion disk. The disk has since reformed and shows strong emission lines.

The system also contains a neutron star which is a pulsar with an unusually long period of 837 seconds. The pulsar has shown period changes that are associated with mass transfer from the more massive primary star. Between 1973 and 1979 it was seen to increase its rate of spin, associated with a strong x-ray flare and presumed strong mass transfer. Since then the spin has been slowing despite small x-ray flares.

The combination of a neutron star and OB emission line star places X Persei in the Be/X-ray binary class of stars.

There is a faint optical companion separated by 22.5" which the Catalog of Components of Double and Multiple Stars refers to as X Persei B. It is a background red giant and a candidate long period variable with the variable star designation V397 Persei.
