= Intermediate mass =

Intermediate mass may refer to:

== Astronomy ==
- An intermediate-mass black hole, a black hole with a mass between 10^{2} and 10^{5} solar masses
- An intermediate-mass star, a star with a mass between 1.8–2.5 and 5–10 solar masses
- An intermediate-mass X-ray binary, an X-ray binary star in which one of the components is an intermediate-mass star

== Medicine ==
- The intermediate mass of thalamus, also known as the interthalamic adhesion
