= Be–white dwarf X-ray binary system =

Type of x-ray binary

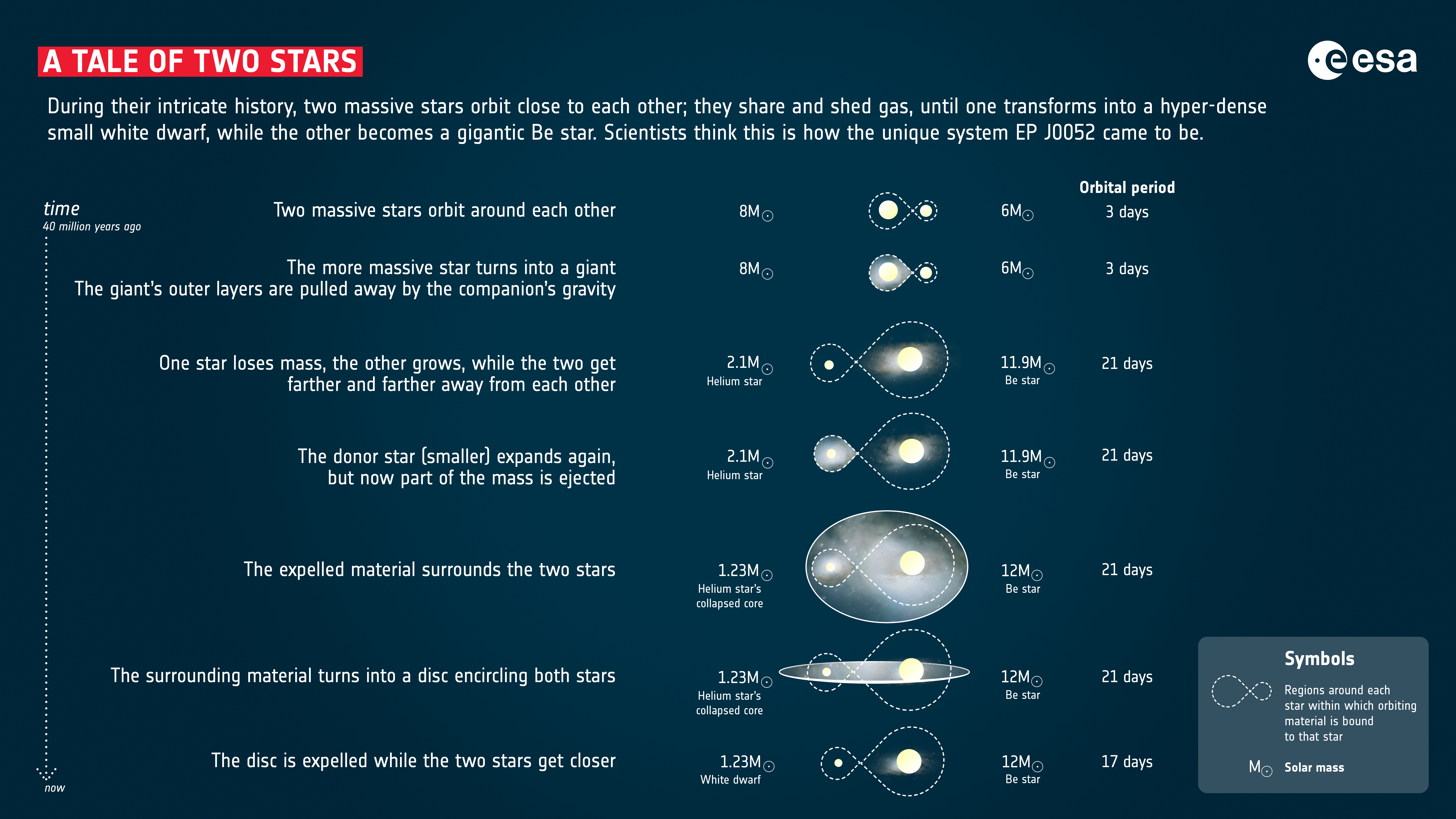
ESA infographic of BeWD EP J0052 formation, observed by the Einstein Probe

Be–white dwarf X-ray binary systems (BeWDs) are a rare type of X-ray binary consisting of a white dwarf that accretes matter from a rapidly-rotating Be star. These systems form through binary evolution where mass transfer spins up the accretor to become a Be star while the donor evolves into a white dwarf.

BeWDs probably originate from a Be star and a subdwarf O or B star binaries. Population synthesis models indicate these systems can evolve through two primary pathways:

- Approximately 60-70% merge into red giants that observationally look like luminous red novae.
- About 30-40% evolve into double white dwarf systems that may be detectable as gravitational wave sources by Laser Interferometer Space Antenna (LISA), and will be its "most likely gravitational wave source".

The formation requires specific initial conditions: the primary must transfer sufficient mass to spin up the secondary to Be star velocities without triggering common envelope evolution. Tidal synchronization mechanisms explain the observed lack of BeWDs with orbital periods shorter than 17 days.

BeWDs can be identified by several features:

- Supersoft X-ray emission (kT ~ 0.1 keV)
- X-ray luminosities of 10^{33}-10^{38} erg/s
- Deep nitrogen (0.67 keV) and oxygen (0.87 keV) absorption edges in X-ray spectra

The white dwarfs in these systems tend to be massive (0.9-1.35 M_{☉}) with surface temperatures of 20,000-40,000 K. Detection is challenging as the white dwarf is often embedded within the Be star's decretion disk, absorbing most extreme-UV and soft X-ray photons.

Some studies suggest that γ Cas stars, a subgroup of Be stars exhibiting bright X-ray emission, likely have white dwarf companions rather than hot subdwarf stars or main sequence stars, as interferometric observations show no detectable companion flux while the systems' properties match theoretical predictions for Be+WD binaries.

Despite theoretical predictions that BeWDs should be 7 times more common than Be-neutron star systems, only 8 have been confirmed as of 2025. According to different numerical models, 40 to 80% of Be stars should have white dwarf companions.

Parameters of the observed BeWDs
BeWD	P_{orb} (day)	L_{X} (erg s^{−1})	M_{WD} (M_{☉})	Be star	Galaxy	Notes and References
XMMU J052016.0-692505	510 or 1020	10^{34}-10^{38}	0.9-1.0	B0-B3e	LMC	observed by XMM-Newton
XMMU J010147-715550	1264	~4.4 × 10^{33}	1.0	O7IIIe-B0Ie	SMC	observed by XMM-Newton
MAXI J0158-744	...	>10^{37}; 10^{40} (peak)	1.35	B1-2IIIe	SMC	observed by MAXI
SWIFT J011511.0-725611	17.402	2 × 10^{33}-3.3 × 10^{36}	1.2	O9IIIe	SMC	observed by Swift
SWIFT J004427.3-734801	21.5	5.7-2.9 × 10^{36}	...	O9Ve-B2IIIe	SMC	observed by Swift
RX J0527.8-6954	...	4-9 × 10^{36}	...	B5eV	LMC	observed by the Gemini South telescope
CXOU J005245.0−722844	17.55 (shortening to 17.14)	6.51 × 10^{38}	1.2	O9V-B0Ve	SMC	discovered "via a very fast, super-Eddington X-ray outburst event"
EP J005245.1−722843	17.55	~4 × 10^{38}	~1.2 (likely Ne-O WD)	O9V-B0Ve	SMC	observed by the Einstein Probe

All identified systems are located in the Magellanic Clouds rather than the Milky Way, possibly due to lower extinction rates allowing easier detection of soft X-rays, or because of the different metallicity of the Magellanic Clouds which may be related to the formation of BeWDs.
