= Neutron star spin-up =

Increase in pulsar rotational speed

Neutron star spin up is the name given to the increase in rotational speed over time first noted in Cen X-3 and Her X-1 but now observed in other X-ray pulsars. In the case of Cen X-3, the pulse period is decreasing over a timescale of 3400 years (defined as $P/\dot{P}$, where $P$ is the rotation period and $\dot{P}$ is the rate of change in the rotation period).

Ever since the detection of the first millisecond pulsar (MSP), it has been theorized that MSPs are neutron stars that have been spun up by accretion in a close binary system. The change in rotational period of the neutron star comes from the transition region between the magnetosphere and the plasma flow from the companion star. In this context the magnetosphere is defined as the region of space surrounding the neutron star, in which the magnetic field determines the motion of the plasma. Inside the magnetic field, the plasma will eventually co-rotate with the neutron star while in the transition region, angular momentum from the accretion disk will be transferred via the magnetic field to the neutron star, leading to the spin-up.

== See also ==
- Stellar spin-down
