= Wojciech Krzemiński =

Polish astronomer

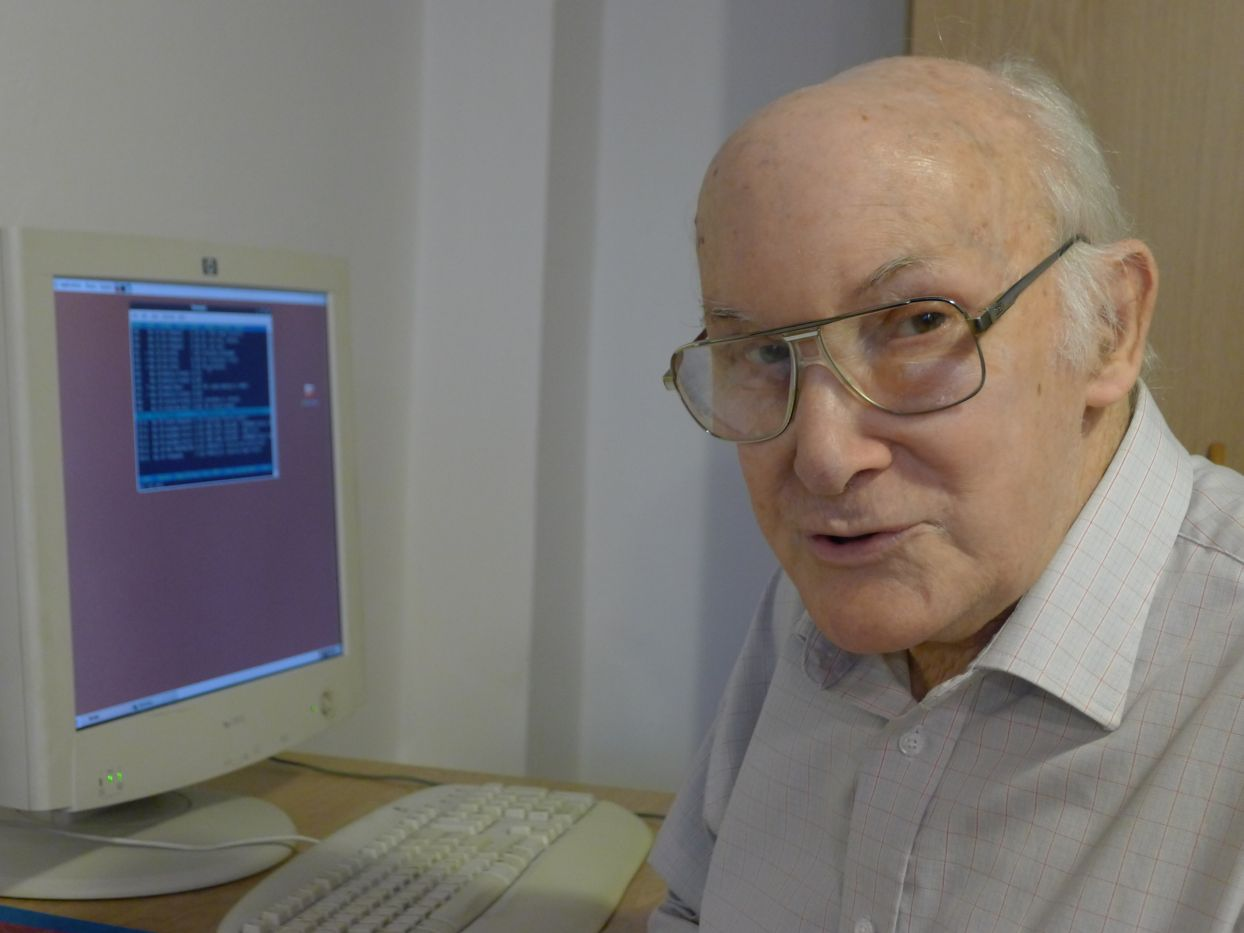
- Born: 20 May 1933; Warsaw, Poland
- Died: 5 August 2017 (aged 84)
- Education: University of Warsaw
- Scientific career
- Fields: astrophysics
- Workplaces: NCAC in Warsaw and the Carnegie Institution Observatories
- Patrons: Polish Academy of Sciences

Wojciech Krzemiński (20 May 1933 – 5 August 2017) was a Polish astronomer and a retired professor of Nicolaus Copernicus Astronomical Center of Polish Academy of Sciences. He worked many years for the Carnegie Institution for Science Observatories.

== Biography ==
Wojciech Krzemiński was a student of professors Stefan Piotrowski and Włodzimierz Zonn. In the early 1960s he was active in Lick Observatory and Lowell Observatory in USA, and at the end of the 1960s he received a scholarship at Carnegie Institution. In 1973, he left – as the first Polish astronomer – to Las Campanas Observatory in Chile. In the 1970s Krzemiński actively collaborated with professors Bohdan Paczyński and Józef Smak. In the 1980s he received an offer to take over as administrator or "resident astronomer" of Las Campanas, position which he held for 16 years. He lived many years in La Serena in Chile and returned to Poland in 2011.

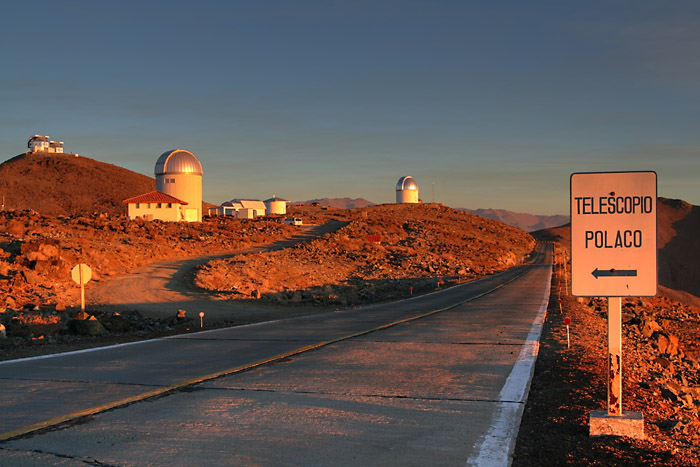
Las Campanas Observatory in Chile with a signpost to "Polish telescopes" built and operated at the observatory by Marcin Kubiak, Andrzej Udalski, Wojciech Krzemiński and Bohdan Paczynski

== Scientific achievements ==
Wojciech Krzemiński was one of the first observers, who in the 1960s demonstrated the dual nature of cataclysmic variables. Together with Joseph Taste suggested that these objects are in process of accretion of matter and correctly interpret their light curve change as coming from the accretion disk impacted through a narrow stream of matter flowing through the inner Lagrange point of less massive component of binary star system.

Also in the 1960s, he performed accurate measurements of the brightness of dwarf novae like U Geminorum, discovered on 4 December 1961. The marked eclipse of U Geminorum repeated with a period of 4 hours 14 minutes and 45 seconds for the first time clearly demonstrating that we are dealing with a double system.

In his original model Krzemiński interpreted the observed changes in the light curve as a consequence of the uneven luminous surface of a white dwarf. Soon, however, it turned out that in the case of U Geminorum it is not a white dwarf that is obscured. Correct model of the system was introduced by Józef Smak, which is for a binary system containing a white dwarf and filling Roche surface of star in main sequence, made the accretion disc and the so-called "hot spot" that is the place where accreting matter collides with the disc. It is the emergence of "hot spots" behind the disc and its eclipse by the secondary component that was responsible for the unusual appearance of the light curve of U Geminorum.

In 1964, Krzemiński and Robert Kraft discovered that the star WZ Sagittae (WZ Sge) is a cataclysmic new dwarf of circulation one hour and 22 minutes. This system is interesting in that it erupts approximately every 11,000 days, increasing in brightness by over a thousand. The outbreak is most likely caused by the instability of the accretion disc, which causes periodic falling on the surface of the white dwarf significantly larger portion of matter.

Krzemiński also discovered the optical companion of X-ray pulsar Centaurus X-3, which was named Krzemiński's Star in his honor.

He was also one of the first astronomers who correctly interpreted the nature of polar stars like AM Herculis.

== Membership in organizations ==
He was a member of Polish Astronomical Society, including in the years 1951–1961 when he was secretary of the board.
