= 4U 1700−37 =

High-mass X-ray binary

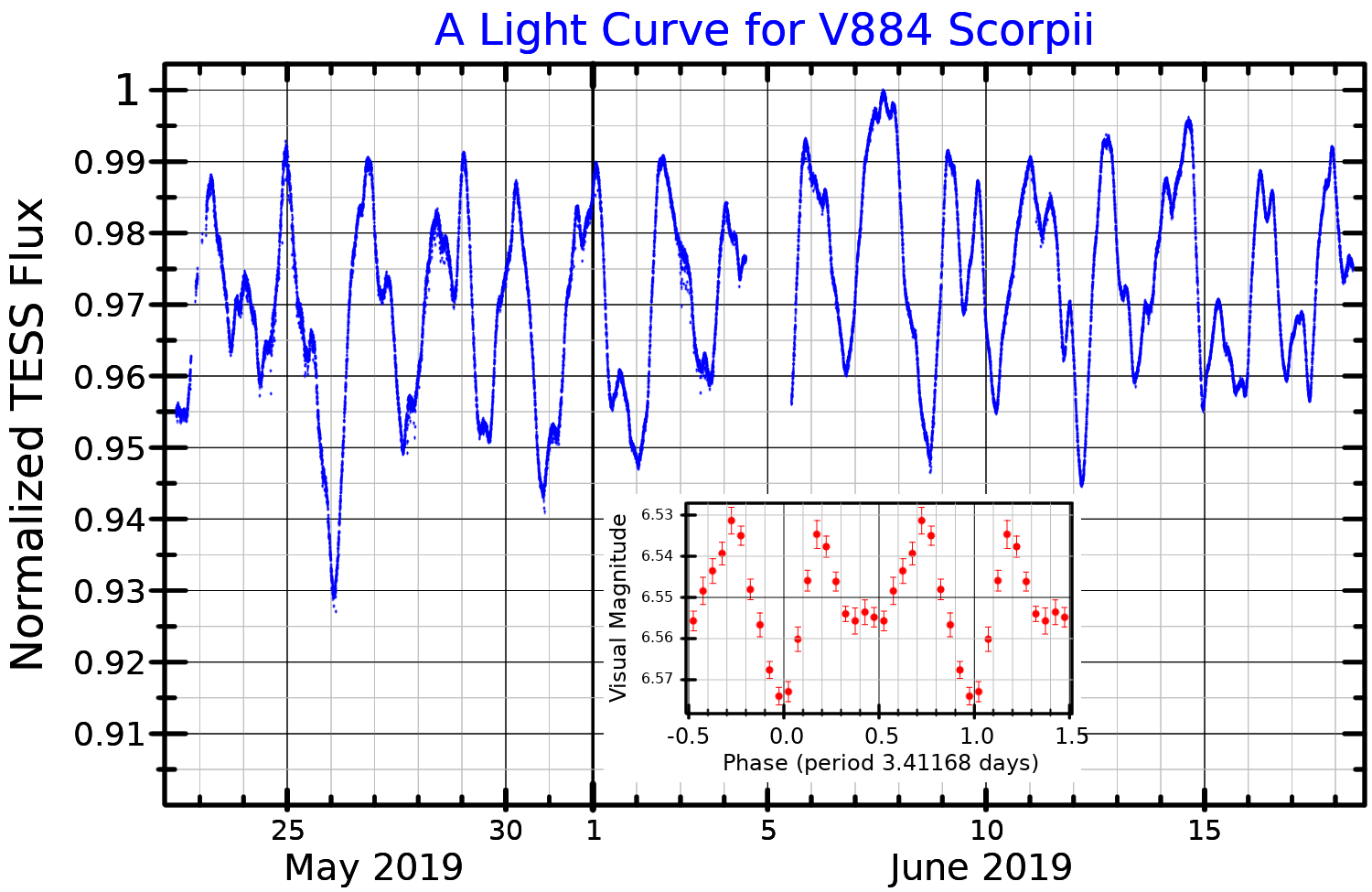
- A light curve for V884 Scorpii. The main plot, from TESS data, shows the variation over several orbital periods. The inset plot, adapted from van Paradijs et al. (1984), shows the average variation as a function of orbit phase.

Observation data Epoch J2000 Equinox ICRS
- Constellation: Scorpius
- Right ascension: 17^{h} 03^{m} 56.77256^{s}
- Declination: −37° 50′ 38.9133″
- Apparent magnitude (V): 6.51 (- 6.57) - 6.60

Characteristics
- Spectral type: O6Iafcp
- U−B color index: −0.727
- B−V color index: +0.253
- Variable type: Ellipsoidal + HMXB

Astrometry
Radial velocity (R_{v})	−75.00±7.4 km/s
Proper motion (μ)	RA: 2.414 mas/yr Dec.: 5.022 mas/yr
Parallax (π)	0.6327±0.0259 mas
Distance	5,200 ± 200 ly (1,580 ± 60 pc)
Absolute magnitude (M_{V})	−6.52

Orbit
Period (P)	3.4118 ± 0.0001 d
Semi-major axis (a)	35±1 R_{☉}″
Eccentricity (e)	0.17±0.06
Inclination (i)	62±1°
Periastron epoch (T)	JD 2443702.62±0.21
Argument of periastron (ω) (primary)	54±24°
Semi-amplitude (K_{1}) (primary)	10.06 ± 0.66 km/s

Details

O star
Mass	46±5 M_{☉}
Radius	21.9+1.3 −0.5 R_{☉}
Luminosity	660,000 L_{☉}
Temperature	35,000±1,000 K

X-ray object
Mass	1.96±0.19 M_{☉}

Other designations
- V884 Sco, CD−37°11206, HD 153919, HIP 83499, SAO 208356

Database references
SIMBAD	data

4U 1700−37 is one of the stronger binary X-ray sources in the sky, and is classified as a high-mass X-ray binary. It was discovered by the Uhuru satellite. The "4U" designation refers to the fourth (and final) Uhuru catalog.

The X-ray source is associated with a bright (6.53 V magnitude) blue supergiant star HD 153919, which is orbited by an accreting neutron star. The X-ray source is eclipsed by the star every 3.4 days, but no pulsations have yet been observed. The source is one of the ten brightest persistent X-ray sources in the 10-100 keV hard X-ray energy region.

Evidence of Compton cooling during an X-ray flare recorded by the Chandra X-ray telescope strongly suggests that the compact object is a neutron star; if verified it would be among the most massive known, and near the boundary of the theoretical maximum.

4U 1700−37 is a runaway system. It has a high velocity of 63±5 km/s with respect to its parent cluster, NGC 6231. It was kicked out of the cluster about 2.2 million years ago by a supernova explosion.
