= X-ray pulsar =

Class of astronomical objects that are X-ray sources

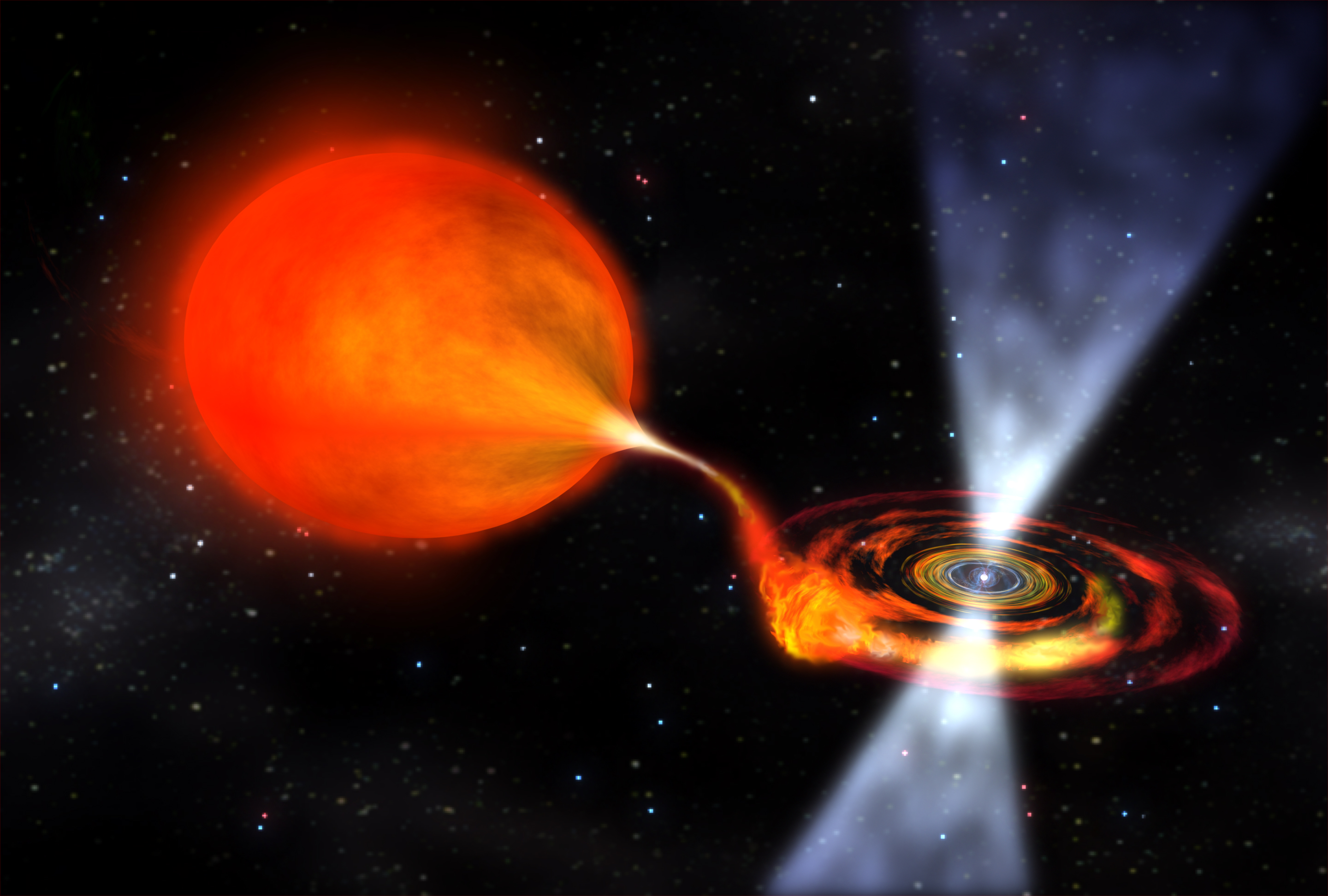
Artist's impression of an X-ray pulsar being spun up by accretion off of a companion star

X-ray pulsars or accretion-powered pulsars are a class of astronomical objects that are X-ray sources displaying strict periodic variations in X-ray intensity. The X-ray periods range from as little as a fraction of a second to as much as several minutes.

== Characteristics ==
An X-ray pulsar is a type of binary star system consisting of a typical star (stellar companion) in orbit around a magnetized neutron star. The magnetic field strength at the surface of the neutron star is typically about 10^{8} tesla, over a trillion times stronger than the strength of the magnetic field measured at the surface of the Earth (60 μT).

Gas is accreted from the stellar companion and is channeled by the neutron star's magnetic field on to the magnetic poles producing two or more localized X-ray hot spots, similar to the two auroral zones on Earth, but far hotter. At these hotspots the infalling gas can reach half the speed of light before it impacts the neutron star surface. So much gravitational potential energy is released by the infalling gas, that the hotspots, which are estimated to be about one square kilometer in area, can be ten thousand times, or more, as luminous as the Sun.

Temperatures of millions of degrees are produced so the hotspots emit mostly X-rays. As the neutron star rotates, pulses of X-rays are observed as the hotspots move in and out of view if the magnetic axis is tilted with respect to the spin axis.

== Gas supply ==
The gas that supplies the X-ray pulsar can reach the neutron star by a variety of ways that depend on the size and shape of the neutron star's orbital path and the nature of the companion star.

Some companion stars of X-ray pulsars are very massive young stars, usually OB supergiants (see stellar classification), that emit a radiation driven stellar wind from their surface. The neutron star is immersed in the wind and continuously captures gas that flows nearby. Vela X-1 is an example of this kind of system.

In other systems, the neutron star orbits so closely to its companion that its strong gravitational force can pull material from the companion's atmosphere into an orbit around itself, a mass transfer process known as Roche lobe overflow. The captured material forms a gaseous accretion disc and spirals inwards to ultimately fall onto the neutron star as in the binary system Cen X-3.

For still other types of X-ray pulsars, the companion star is a Be star that rotates very rapidly and apparently sheds a disk of gas around its equator. The orbits of the neutron star with these companions are usually large and very elliptical in shape. When the neutron star passes nearby or through the Be circumstellar disk, it will capture material and temporarily become an X-ray pulsar. The circumstellar disk around the Be star expands and contracts for unknown reasons, so these are transient X-ray pulsars that are observed only intermittently, often with months to years between episodes of observable X-ray pulsation. The Be/X-ray binary SXP 214 is an example of a Be-companion X-ray pulsar.

== Spin behaviors ==
Radio pulsars (rotation-powered pulsars) and X-ray pulsars exhibit very different spin behaviors and have different mechanisms producing their characteristic pulses although it is accepted that both kinds of pulsar are manifestations of a rotating magnetized neutron star. The rotation cycle of the neutron star in both cases is identified with the pulse period.

The major differences are that radio pulsars have periods on the order of milliseconds to seconds, and all radio pulsars are losing angular momentum and slowing down. In contrast, the X-ray pulsars exhibit a variety of spin behaviors. Some X-ray pulsars are observed to be continuously spinning faster and faster or slower and slower (with occasional reversals in these trends) while others show either little change in pulse period or display erratic spin-down and spin-up behavior.

The explanation of this difference can be found in the physical nature of the two pulsar classes. Over 99% of radio pulsars are single objects that radiate away their rotational energy in the form of relativistic particles and magnetic dipole radiation, lighting up any nearby nebulae that surround them. In contrast, X-ray pulsars are members of binary star systems and accrete matter from either stellar winds or accretion disks. The accreted matter transfers angular momentum to (or from) the neutron star causing the spin rate to increase or decrease at rates that are often hundreds of times faster than the typical spin down rate in radio pulsars. Exactly why the X-ray pulsars show such varied spin behavior is still not clearly understood.

== Observations ==
X-ray pulsars are observed using X-ray telescopes that are satellites in low Earth orbit although some observations have been made, mostly in the early years of X-ray astronomy, using detectors carried by balloons or sounding rockets. The first X-ray pulsar to be discovered was Centaurus X-3, in 1971 with the Uhuru X-ray satellite.

== Anomalous X-ray pulsars ==
Magnetars, isolated and highly-magnetised neutron stars, can be observed as relatively slow x-ray pulsars with periods of a few seconds. These are referred to as anomalous X-ray pulsars, but are unrelated to binary X-ray pulsars.

== See also ==
- Millisecond pulsar
- Pulsar planets
- List of X-ray pulsars
- X-ray pulsar-based navigation
