= Supergiant fast X-ray transient =

Type of high-mass X-ray binary

Light curve of supergiant fast X-ray transient (SFXT) candidate MAXI J0709–159

A supergiant fast X-ray transient (SFXT) is a type of transient high-mass X-ray binary (HMXB) containing an OB supergiant. SFXTs experience short, sporadic flares where their luminosity increases dramatically over less than an hour. However, they spend the majority of their time in quiescence with low luminosities and rates of accretion. The source of the extreme behavior of SFXTs is not fully known, but it is believed that variability in the donor star's stellar wind plays a role. Advanced space telescopes such as INTEGRAL have allowed for the detection, identification, and classification of SFXTs.

== Dynamics ==
SFXTs have short, sporadic flares lasting only tens of minutes to hours and occurring every few months. Flares occur during day-long outbursts of higher-than-average luminosity and take less than an hour to reach their peak X-ray luminosity of ~10^{35}–10^{37} erg/s. Flares may show complex variability, with several luminosity peaks throughout the flare. The X-ray emission from SFXTs is significantly absorbed.

SFXTs only spend about 5% of their time flaring. During quiescence the X-ray fluxes of SFXTs are 2–5 orders of magnitude fainter than during flares, at ~10^{33}–10^{34} erg/s and ~10^{36} erg/s respectively. SFXTs accrete during both flaring and quiescent states, but during quiescence, they accrete at very low rates. Very rarely, an SFXT may stop accreting whatsoever during a quiescent phase. SFXTs mostly emit hard X-rays while flaring and soft X-rays while quiescent.

== Properties and source of variability ==
Other than their strong variability, SFXTs have similar properties to classical SgXBs. Most SFXTs are believed to contain neutron stars with magnetic fields of ~10^{11}–10^{12} G. Some SFXTs have been observed to pulse or have X-ray spectra typical of neutron stars. SFXTs have similar compact object spin periods and binary orbital periods to classical supergiant X-ray binaries (SgXBs) and Be/X-ray binaries (BeXBs).

SFXTs have been observed to have stellar winds that are different from classical SgXBs. In general, their stellar wind is believed to be less dense on average and it has been suggested that different regimes of accretion of these winds may explain the variability observed in SFXTs. It has also been hypothesized that flares happen when particularly large "clumps" of the stellar wind are accreted by the compact object.

SFXTs also have slightly higher eccentricity with respect to orbital period compared to classical SgXBs and BeXBs, which has led some researchers to suggest that flares occur when the companion star passes close to the compact object, but observations have found no relation between orbital phase and flaring states, indicating that eccentricity alone cannot explain the variability of SFXTs. Thus, the "clumpy wind" hypothesis has become the dominant theory explaining SFXT behavior. However, attempted observations of these clumps have been inconsistent and further requirements, such as specific modes of accretion, may be necessary to explain the extreme variability of SFXTs.

== Observation ==
SFXTs were discovered after traditional SgXBs because they are more difficult to detect; traditional SgXBs are persistent sources with bright X-ray emission and many were discovered during the early days of X-ray astronomy. The INTEGRAL spacecraft allowed transient sources to more easily be discovered, unveiling several SFXTs by the early 2000s.

During quiescence, SFXTs may be precisely localized by sensitive soft X-ray telescopes such as XMM-Newton, Chandra, and Swift. This allows for their companions to be identified in the optical or infrared as OB supergiants.

As of 2024, about 20 SFXTs and SFXT candidates have been identified. SFXTs are believed to make up a much higher proportion of HMXBs, but their properties make them difficult to find. As of July 2011, only neutron stars have been found in SFXTs, although black holes cannot be ruled out.
