= Symbiotic X-ray binary =

Type of low-mass X-ray binary

A symbiotic x-ray binary (SyXB) is a type of low-mass X-ray binary (LMXB) containing a neutron star or black hole accreting off of the stellar wind of a K- or M-type giant. SyXBs are characterized by their unique method of accretion, long neutron star spin periods, long orbital periods, and low luminosities. Although the first SyXB was discovered in the 1970s, very few have been discovered since, and no black hole SyXBs have been found at all. SyXBs are believed to be disproportionately the products of electron-capture supernovae.

== Formation ==
Evolutionary tracks of neutron star/main-sequence binaries. If the pair has a wide orbit, it will evolve into an SyXB.

When a neutron star forms in a supernova, it generally experiences a supernova "kick" that changes its velocity. In the case of SyXBs, the neutron star must experience a relatively small kick—less than 1/6 of typical—in order to stay bound to its companion. Because of this, it has been suggested that SyXBs may be disproportionately the results of electron-capture supernovae.

== Properties ==
SyXBs accrete from the donor star's stellar wind and, unlike most other LMXBs, do not experience Roche lobe overflow. They are analogues to the cataclysmic variable symbiotic stars, where the accretor is a white dwarf instead of a neutron star. They also display similar properties to Be/X-ray binaries, which also contain a compact object accreting off of the stellar wind of another star, although in the case of Be/X-ray binaries, the donor star is high-mass.

SyXBs have relatively low X-ray luminosities of 10^{32}–10^{36} erg s^{-1}. Their X-ray spectra are very hard and variable, and their optical spectra lack emission lines and are dominated almost completely by the donor star. SyXBs have orbital periods of months to years, some of the highest orbital periods of any LMXBs. They also have very slowly-rotating compact objects compared to other known LMXBs. Nearly all SyXBs are transients, with only one persistent SyXB known (GX 1+4).

== Observation ==
Light curves of SyXB IGR J16194–2810

The first SyXB was discovered in 1977; despite their long observational history, however, SyXBs remain relatively rare. There are expected to be hundreds to thousands of SyXBs in the galaxy, the vast majority of which have not yet been found.

As of December 2024, no black hole SyXBs have been found. However, this does not necessarily mean they cannot exist. Black hole SyXBs would likely have a very low X-ray luminosity because much of the accreted material would either fall into the black hole or be lost as outflows.

As of July 2024, 3 black holes and 21 neutron stars in AU-scale orbits with low-mass stars have been found by the Gaia telescope. Although they are currently quiescent, these binaries are expected to eventually evolve into SyXBs.

== Properties of known SyXBs ==
Name	Rotational period (s)	Orbital period (d)	X-ray luminosity (erg s^{-1})	Donor spectral type	References
GX 1+4	120	1161	10^{35}–10^{36}	M5	
4U 1954+31	18300	≥400	4×10^{32}–10^{35}	M4	
4U 1700+24		404	2×10^{32}–10^{34}	M2	
Scutum X-1	113		2×10^{34}	Late K/early M	
IGR J16194–2810	14616	192.73	≤7×10^{34}	M2	
IRXS J180431.1–273932	494		≤6×10^{34}	M6	
IGR J16358–4724	5850		3×10^{32}–3×10^{36}		
IGR J16393–4643	912	50.2			
2XMM J174016.0–290337	626		~3×10^{34}	K1	
CGCS 5926		151	≤3×10^{32}	Carbon star	
CXOGBS J173620.2–293338			3.0×10^{31}–7.2×10^{32}	Carbon star	
XTE J1743–363			1.1×10^{36}	M8	
CXOGBS J174614.3−321949			~8.4×10^{32} (low-luminosity state); ~1.7×10^{34} (high-luminosity state)	Early M	
3XMM J181923.7–170616	407.9			K3	
XMMU J174445.5–29504			≥4×10^{34}		
IGR J17329–2731	6680		3×10^{35}		
IGR J17197–3010			≤1.6×10^{35}		
CXOGBS J174614.3−321949			10^{34}		
CXOGBS J173620.2−293338			≤10^{33}		
Swift J2037.2+4151			10^{36}		
