= Garrett Jernigan =

American physicist

J. Garrett Jernigan was an American physicist and astronomer who has made notable contributions to space astronomy, particularly in the areas of X-ray and infrared instrumentation. He received his Ph.D. at MIT, where he worked on the SAS 3 X-ray astronomy satellite. After leaving MIT he moved to UC Berkeley, where he has worked in many areas of astronomical instrumentation, observation, and theory. He currently advises the CubeSat program at Sonoma State University.
