= X-ray burster =

Class of X-ray binary stars

Example profiles of thermonuclear bursts observed from X-ray bursters by satellite-based X-ray telescopes, demonstrating the range of durations and intensities. From top to bottom, the figure shows an intermediate-duration burst observed with BeppoSAX/WFC from M15 X-2; a mixed H/He burst observed with INTEGRAL/JEM-X from GS 1826−24, and an H-deficient burst observed with RXTE/PCA from 4U 1728−34.

X-ray bursters are one class of X-ray binary stars exhibiting X-ray bursts, periodic and rapid increases in luminosity (typically a factor of 10 or greater) that peak in the X-ray region of the electromagnetic spectrum. These astrophysical systems are composed of an accreting neutron star and a main sequence companion 'donor' star. There are two types of X-ray bursts, designated I and II. Type I bursts are caused by thermonuclear runaway, while type II arise from the release of gravitational (potential) energy liberated through accretion. For type I (thermonuclear) bursts, the mass transferred from the donor star accumulates on the surface of the neutron star until it ignites and fuses in a burst, producing X-rays. The behaviour of X-ray bursters is similar to the behaviour of recurrent novae. In the latter case the compact object is a white dwarf that accretes hydrogen that finally undergoes explosive burning.

The compact object of the broader class of X-ray binaries is either a neutron star or a black hole; however, with the emission of an X-ray burst, the compact object can immediately be classified as a neutron star, since black holes do not have a surface and all of the accreting material disappears past the event horizon. X-ray binaries hosting a neutron star can be further subdivided based on the mass of the donor star; either a high mass (above 10 solar masses (M_{☉})) or low mass (less than 1 M_{☉}) X-ray binary, abbreviated as HMXB and LMXB, respectively.

X-ray bursts typically exhibit a sharp rise time (1–10 seconds) followed by spectral softening (a property of cooling black bodies). Individual burst energetics are characterized by an integrated flux of 10^{32}–10^{33} joules, compared to the steady luminosity which is of the order 10^{30} W for steady accretion onto a neutron star. As such the ratio α of the burst flux to the persistent flux ranges from 10 to 1000 but is typically on the order of 100. The X-ray bursts emitted from most of these systems recur on timescales ranging from hours to days, although more extended recurrence times are exhibited in some systems, and weak bursts with recurrence times between 5–20 minutes have yet to be explained but are observed in some less usual cases. The abbreviation XRB can refer either to the object (X-ray burster) or to the associated emission (X-ray burst).

== Thermonuclear burst astrophysics ==
When a star in a binary fills its Roche lobe (either due to being very close to its companion or having a relatively large radius), it begins to lose matter, which streams towards its neutron star companion. The star may also undergo mass loss by exceeding its Eddington luminosity, or through strong stellar winds, and some of this material may become gravitationally attracted to the neutron star. In the circumstance of a short orbital period and a massive partner star, both of these processes may contribute to the transfer of material from the companion to the neutron star. In both cases, the falling material originates from the surface layers of the partner star and is thus rich in hydrogen and helium. The matter streams from the donor into the accretor at the intersection of the two Roche lobes, which is also the location of the first Lagrange point, L1. Because of the revolution of the two stars around a common centre of gravity, the material then forms a jet travelling towards the accretor. Because compact stars have high gravitational fields, the material falls with a high velocity and angular momentum towards the neutron star. The angular momentum prevents it from immediately joining the surface of the accreting star. It continues to orbit the accretor in the orbital plane, colliding with other accreting material en route, thereby losing energy, and in so doing forming an accretion disk, which also lies in the orbital plane.

In an X-ray burster, this material accretes onto the surface of the neutron star, where it forms a dense layer. After mere hours of accumulation and gravitational compression, nuclear fusion starts in this matter. This begins as a stable process, the hot CNO cycle. However, continued accretion creates a degenerate shell of matter, in which the temperature rises (greater than 10^{9} kelvin) but this does not alleviate thermodynamic conditions. This causes the triple-α cycle to quickly become favored, resulting in a helium flash. The additional energy provided by this flash allows the CNO burning to break out into thermonuclear runaway. The early phase of the burst is powered by the alpha-p process, which quickly yields to the rp-process. Nucleosynthesis can proceed as high as mass number 100, but was shown to end definitively at isotopes of tellurium that undergo alpha decay such as ^{107}Te. Within seconds, most of the accreted material is burned, powering a bright X-ray flash that is observable with X-ray (or gamma ray) telescopes. Theory suggests that there are several burning regimes which cause variations in the burst, such as ignition condition, energy released, and recurrence, with the regimes caused by the nuclear composition, both of the accreted material and the burst ashes. This is mostly dependent on hydrogen, helium, or carbon content. Carbon ignition may also be the cause of the extremely rare "superbursts".

== Observation of bursts ==
Because an enormous amount of energy is released in a short period of time, much of it is released as high energy photons in accordance with the theory of black-body radiation, in this case X-rays. This release of energy powers the X-ray burst, and may be observed as in increase in the star's luminosity with a space telescope. These bursts cannot be observed on Earth's surface because our atmosphere is opaque to X-rays. Most X-ray bursting stars exhibit recurrent bursts because the bursts are not powerful enough to disrupt the stability or orbit of either star, and the whole process may begin again.

Most X-ray bursters have irregular burst periods, which can be on the order of a few hours to many months, depending on factors such as the masses of the stars, the distance between the two stars, the rate of accretion, and the exact composition of the accreted material. Observationally, the X-ray burst categories exhibit different features. A Type I X-ray burst has a sharp rise followed by a slow and gradual decline of the luminosity profile. A Type II X-ray burst exhibits a quick pulse shape and may have many fast bursts separated by minutes. Most observed X-ray bursts are of Type I, as Type II X-ray bursts have been observed from only two sources.

More finely detailed variations in burst observation have been recorded as the X-ray imaging telescopes improve. Within the familiar burst lightcurve shape, anomalies such as oscillations (called quasi-periodic oscillations) and dips have been observed, with various nuclear and physical explanations being offered, though none yet has been proven.

X-ray spectroscopy has revealed in bursts from EXO 0748-676 a 4 keV absorption feature and H and He-like absorption lines in Fe. The subsequent derivation of redshift of Z=0.35 implies a constraint for the mass-radius equation of the neutron star, a relationship which is still a mystery but is a major priority for the astrophysics community. However, the narrow line profiles are inconsistent with the rapid (552 Hz) spin of the neutron star in this object, and it seems more likely that the line features arise from the accretion disc.

== Applications to astronomy ==
Luminous X-ray bursts can be considered standard candles, since the mass of the neutron star determines the luminosity of the burst. Therefore, comparing the observed X-ray flux to the predicted value yields relatively accurate distances. Observations of X-ray bursts also allow the determination of the radius of the neutron star.

== See also ==
- Gamma-ray burst
- Soft X-ray transient
