= Vela X-1 =

X-ray emission source in the constellation Vela

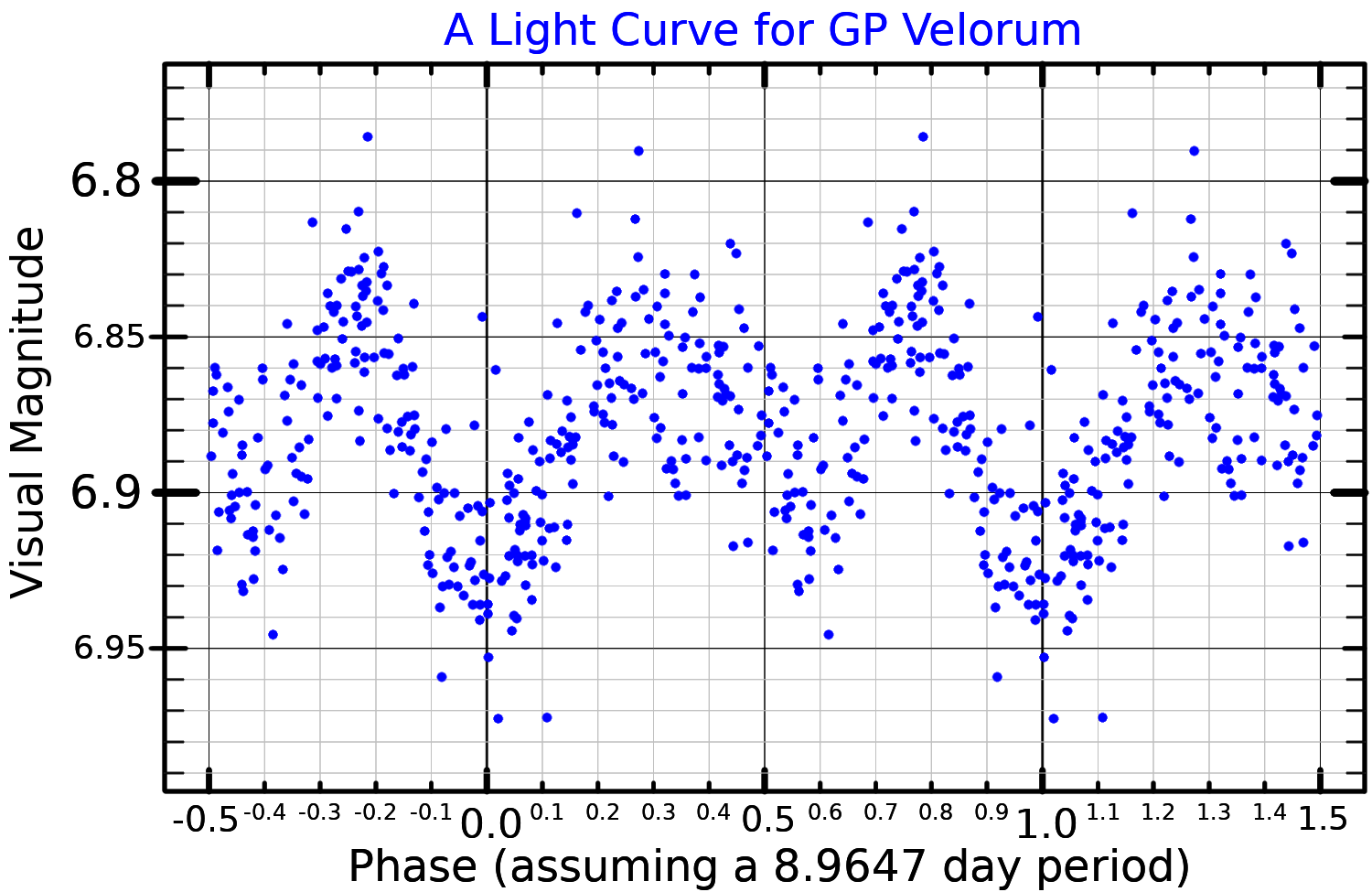
- A visual band light curve for GP Velorum, adapted from Tjemkes et al. (1986)

Observation data Epoch J2000.0 Equinox ICRS
- Constellation: Vela
- Right ascension: 09^{h} 02^{m} 06.861^{s}
- Declination: −40° 33′ 16.90″
- Apparent magnitude (V): 6.87

Characteristics
- Spectral type: B0.5Ia
- Apparent magnitude (B): 7.301
- Apparent magnitude (V): 6.926
- Apparent magnitude (J): 5.833±0.020
- Apparent magnitude (H): 5.705±0.034
- Apparent magnitude (K): 5.596±0.024
- U−B color index: −0.51
- B−V color index: 0.50
- Variable type: Complex

Astrometry
Proper motion (μ)	RA: −4.822 mas/yr Dec.: 9.282 mas/yr
Parallax (π)	0.4962±0.0152 mas
Distance	6,600 ± 200 ly (2,020 ± 60 pc)

Orbit
Semi-major axis (a)	59.6±0.7 R_{☉}
Inclination (i)	72.8±0.4°

Details

Pulsar
Mass	2.12±0.16 M_{☉}
Radius	9.56±0.08 km

Supergiant
Mass	26±1 M_{☉}
Radius	29±1 R_{☉}

Other designations
- Supergiant component: GP Vel, HD 77581, SAO 220767, HIP 44368, CPD−40°3072, CD−40°4838; X-ray component: 1XRS 09002-403, 1RXS J090207.0-403311, 4U 0900-40

Database references
SIMBAD	data

Vela X-1 is a pulsing, eclipsing high-mass X-ray binary (HMXB) system, associated with the Uhuru source 4U 0900-40 and the supergiant star HD 77581. The X-ray emission of the neutron star is caused by the capture and accretion of matter from the stellar wind of the supergiant companion. Vela X-1 is the prototypical detached HMXB.

The orbital period of the system is 8.964 days, with the neutron star being eclipsed for about two days of each orbit by HD 77581. It has been given the variable star designation GP Velorum, and it varies from visual magnitude 6.76 to 6.99. The spin period of the neutron star is about 283 seconds, and gives rise to strong X-ray pulsations. The mass of the pulsar is estimated to be 2.12±0.16 solar masses.

== Characteristics ==
Long term monitoring of the spin period shows small random increases and decreases over time similar to a random walk. The accreting matter causes the random spin period changes. However, a recent study has detected nearly periodic spin period reversals in Vela X-1 on long time-scales of about 5.9 years.

== See also ==
- High-mass X-ray binary
- List of X-ray pulsars
- X-ray binary
