= Pulsar kick =

Phenomenon in astrophysics

A pulsar kick is the name of the phenomenon that often causes a neutron star to move with a different, usually substantially greater, velocity than its progenitor star. The cause of pulsar kicks is unknown, but many astrophysicists believe that it must be due to an asymmetry in the way a supernova explodes. If true, this would give information about the supernova mechanism.

== Observation ==
It is generally accepted today that the average pulsar kick ranges from 200 to 500 km/s. However, some pulsars have a much greater velocity. For example, the hypervelocity star B1508+55 has been reported to have a speed of 1,100 km/s and a trajectory leading it out of the galaxy. An extremely convincing example of a pulsar kick can be seen in the Guitar Nebula, where the bow shock generated by the pulsar moving relative to the supernova remnant nebula has been observed and confirms a velocity of 800 km/s.

Of particular interest is whether the magnitude or direction of the pulsar kick has any correlation with other properties of the pulsar, such as the spin axis, magnetic moment, or magnetic field strength. To date, no correlation has been found between the magnetic field strength and the magnitude of the kick. However, there is some contention over whether a correlation between spin axis and kick direction has been observed. For many years, it was believed that no correlation existed. In studies of the Vela and Crab pulsars, jets have been observed which are believed to align with the spin axis of the pulsar. Since these jets align very closely with the bow shock as well as the directly measured velocity of the pulsars, this is considered strong evidence that these pulsars have kicks aligned with their spin axis. It is also possible to measure the spin axis of a pulsar using the polarization of its radiation, and a recent study of 24 pulsars has found a strong correlation between the polarization and kick direction. Such studies have always been fraught with difficulty, however, since uncertainties associated with the polarization measurement are very large, making correlation studies troublesome.

There is a possibility that the distribution of kick speeds is bimodal. Strong evidence for this possibility comes from the "neutron star retention problem". Most globular clusters in the Milky Way have an escape velocity under 50 km/s, so that few pulsars should have any difficulty in escaping. In fact, with the directly measured distribution of kick velocities, we would expect less than 1% of all pulsars born in a globular cluster to remain. But this is not the case—globular clusters contain many pulsars, some in excess of 1,000. The number can be improved somewhat if one allows a fraction of the kick momentum to be transferred to a binary partner. In this case, perhaps 6% ought to survive, but this is not sufficient to explain the discrepancy. This appears to imply that some large set of pulsars receive virtually no kick at all while others receive a very large kick. It would be difficult to see this bimodal distribution directly because many speed measurement schemes only put an upper limit on the object's speed. If it is true that some pulsars receive very little kick, this might give us insight into the mechanism for pulsar kicks, since a complete explanation would have to predict this possibility.

== Theories ==
Many hydrodynamical theories have been proposed, all of which attempt to explain the asymmetry in supernova using convection or mechanical instabilities in the presupernova star. Perhaps the easiest to understand is the "overstable g-mode". In this theory, we first assume that the core is pushed slightly to one side, off center from the star. This increases the pressure in the nearby silicon and oxygen shells of the star. Since the rate of nuclear reactions in these shells is very sensitively dependent on pressure, the added pressure results in a large release of energy, and the core is pushed back the other way. This in turn adds greater pressure on the other side, and we find that the core begins to oscillate. It has been shown that many such modes are overstable in heavy stars, that is, a small perturbation becomes large over time. When the star explodes, the core has additional momentum in some direction, which we observe as the kick. It has been proposed that hydrodynamical models can explain the bimodal distribution, through a "dichotomous kick scenario" in which the envelope of the presupernova star is stolen by a binary companion, dampening mechanical instabilities and thus reducing the resulting kick.

There are two main neutrino driven kick scenarios, relying on the parity violation of neutrino interactions to explain an asymmetry in neutrino distribution. The first uses the fact that in the presence of a magnetic field, the direction that a neutrino is scattered off a nucleus is biased in some direction. So if neutrino emission happened in the presence of a strong magnetic field, we might expect the average neutrino drift to align in some way with that field, and thus the resulting explosion would be asymmetric. A main problem with this theory is that to have sufficient asymmetry the theory requires fields of order 10^{15} G, much stronger than is expected in a heavy star. Another neutrino based theory uses the fact that the cross section for neutrino scattering depends weakly on the strength of the ambient magnetic field. Thus, if the magnetic field is itself anisotropic, then there could be dark spots which are essentially opaque to neutrinos. This however requires anisotropies of order 10^{16} G, which is even more unlikely.

The final main proposal is known as the electromagnetic rocket scenario. In this theory, we assume the pulsar's magnetic dipole to be offcenter and offaxis from the pulsar's spin axis. This results in an asymmetry in the magnitude of the dipole oscillations, as seen from above and below, which in turn means an asymmetry in the emission of radiation. The radiation pressure then slowly rockets the pulsar away. Notice that this is a postnatal kick, and has nothing to do with asymmetries in the supernova itself. Also notice that this process steals energy from the pulsar's spin, and so a main observational constraint on the theory is the observed rate of rotation for pulsar's throughout the galaxy. A major bonus to this theory is that it actually predicts the spin-kick correlation. However, there are some uncertainties as to whether this can generate sufficient energy to explain the full range of kick velocities.

== Black hole kicks ==
The large distances above the galactic plane achieved by some binaries are the result of stellar black hole natal kicks. The velocity distribution of black hole natal kicks seems similar to that of neutron-star kick velocities. One might have expected that it would be the momenta that were the same with black holes receiving lower velocity than neutron stars due to their higher mass but that does not seem to be the case.

A 2023 study suggested from numerical simulations of high-energy collision a limit of around 10% of the light speed for black hole kicks.

== See also ==
- Stellar kinematics

== Bibliography ==
- Podsiadlowski, Philipp; Pfahl, Eric & Rappaport, Saul (2005). "Neutron-Star Birth Kicks". ASP Conference Series. 328: 327–336. Bibcode:2005ASPC..328..327P.
- Lai, Dong; Chernoff, David F. & Cordes, James M. (2001). "Pulsar Jets: Implications for Neutron Star Kicks and Initial Spins". Astrophysical Journal. 549 (2): 1111–1118. arXiv:astro-ph/0007272. Bibcode:2001ApJ...549.1111L. doi:10.1086/319455. S2CID 1990229.
- Cordes, James M.; Romani, Roger W. & Lundgren, Scott C. (1993). "The Guitar Nebula: a bow shock from a slow-spin, high-velocity neutron star". Nature. 362 (6416): 133–135. Bibcode:1993Natur.362..133C. doi:10.1038/362133a0. S2CID 4341019.
- Lai, Dong (1999). "Physics of Neutron Star Kicks". Stellar Astrophysics. Astrophysics and Space Science Library. Vol. 254. pp. 127–136. arXiv:astro-ph/9912522. Bibcode:2000ASSL..254..127L. doi:10.1007/978-94-010-0878-5_15. ISBN 978-94-010-3791-4. S2CID 18944918.
- Wang, Chen; Lai, Dong & Han, J. L. (2006). "Neutron Star Kicks in Isolated and Binary Pulsars: Observational Constraints and Implications for Kick Mechanisms". The Astrophysical Journal. 639 (2): 1007–1017. arXiv:astro-ph/0509484. Bibcode:2006ApJ...639.1007W. doi:10.1086/499397. S2CID 1231368.
