= Hercules X-1 =

Binary Star in the constellation Hercules

Her X-1
Observation data Epoch J2000 Equinox ICRS
- Constellation: Hercules
- Right ascension: 16^{h} 57^{m} 49.83^{s}
- Declination: +35° 20′ 32.6″
- Apparent magnitude (V): 13.83
Spectral type	DA

Other designations
- 4U 1656+35, HZ Her

Database references
SIMBAD	data

Hercules X-1 (Her X-1), also known as 4U1656+35, is a moderately strong X-ray binary source first studied by the Uhuru satellite. It is composed of a neutron star accreting matter from a normal star (HZ Her) probably due to Roche lobe overflow.

== Intermediate-mass X-ray binary (IMXB) ==
Her X-1 is the prototype for the massive X-ray binaries although it falls on the borderline, ~2 M_{☉}, between high- and low-mass X-ray binaries.

An intermediate-mass X-ray binary (IMXB) is a binary star system where one of the components is a neutron star or a black hole. The other component is an intermediate mass star.

== Intensity ==
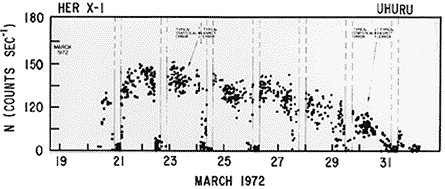
This light curve of Her X-1 shows long term and medium term variability. Each pair of vertical lines delineate the eclipse of the compact object behind its companion star. In this case, the companion is a 2 Solar-mass star with a radius of nearly 4 times that of the Sun. This eclipse shows the 1.7-day orbital period of the system.

The source exhibits complex time variability, pulsing with a period of 1.24 s due to the rotation of the neutron star, eclipsing every 1.70 days with the period of the binary orbit, and also varying with a 35-day period believed associated with the precession of the accretion disk. From observations, a twisted accretion disk, in retrograde precession, modulates the X-rays illuminating HZ Her and Earth.

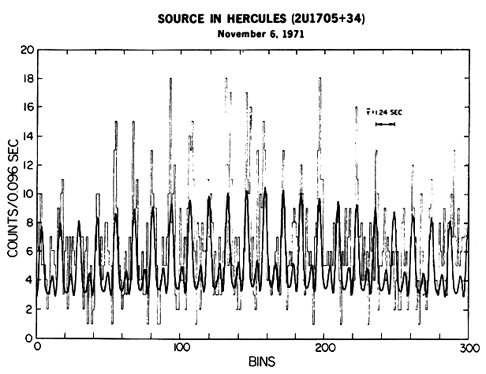
Uhuru observations revealed the presence of X-ray pulsations in Her X-1 (1.2 s) and confirmed that it contains a rapidly rotating neutron star. Figure adapted from figures by E. Schreier, STScI, taken from Figure 7-2a in Charles and Seward.

The 1.24 second pulsar period associated with Her X-1 is immediately evident from the data. The sharp cut-off at ~24 keV in the flat spectrum observed for Her X-1 in this exposure provided the first reported evidence for radiative transfer effects to be associated with a highly magnetized plasma near the surface of a neutron star.

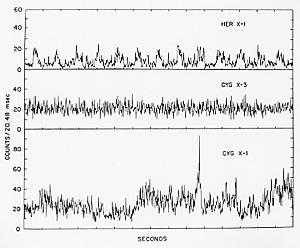
The figure shows 15-second samples of the raw counts (per 20.48 ms) observed in a 1973 sounding-rocket-borne exposure to three of the X-ray brightest binary sources in the Milky Way galaxy: Her X-1 (1.7 days), Cyg X-3 (0.2 day), and Cyg X-1 (5.6 days).

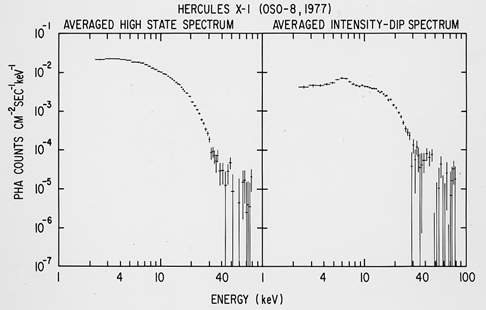
OSO 8 spectra of Hercules X-1

== Discovery of Her X-1 ==
The actual announcement of the discovery of Hercules X-1 by Uhuru occurred at the 1971–72 Winter Meeting of the High-Energy Astrophysics Division AAS held in San Juan. The original discovery of this periodically pulsating binary X-ray source occurred in November 1971.

== Location ==
The position of Her X-1 was uncertain due to the failure of the Uhuru star aspect sensors, having been reported at J1950 RA 17^{h}05^{m} Dec 34°52' using Uhuru and at 16^{h}56.7^{m} Dec 35°35' using OSO 7. However, there is only one weak X-ray source (2U 1735+43) within 10° of Her X-1. But four radio sources: (1) RA 16^{h}56^{m}50.75^{s} Dec 35°14'33 ± 3" of a double point source separated by 17±2" and a stellar image 13±3" from the centroid, (2) RA 16^{h}57^{m}10.65^{s} Dec 35°21'35 ± 3" within 6±3" of the stellar image, (3) RA 16^{h}57^{m}35.72^{s} Dec 35°15'19 ± 3" with no star visible on the Palomar Sky Survey print, and (4) RA 16^{h}58^{m}39.17^{s} Dec 35°10'53 ± 3" were found near the overlap of Uhuru and OSO 7 positions. At that time the search could not discover the radio counterpart of Her X-1 if its radio emission were analogous to its 36-day periodic X-ray behavior, although there was no compelling astrophysical reason for the two fluxes to be correlated. The four sources above were observed during several eclipse phases of the X-ray star. No radio eclipses were detected that corresponded. At that time Doxsey specified that (1) repeated radio searches, especially during the high X-ray luminosity state of Her X-1, should be made and (2) there was a clear need for a better position determination for Her X-1.

In 1973, Bahcall and Bahcall determined that HZ Herculis had a light curve that matched Hercules X-1's, fixing Hercules X-1's position.
