= Uhuru (satellite) =

NASA X-ray astronomy satellite (1970–1973, decay 1979)

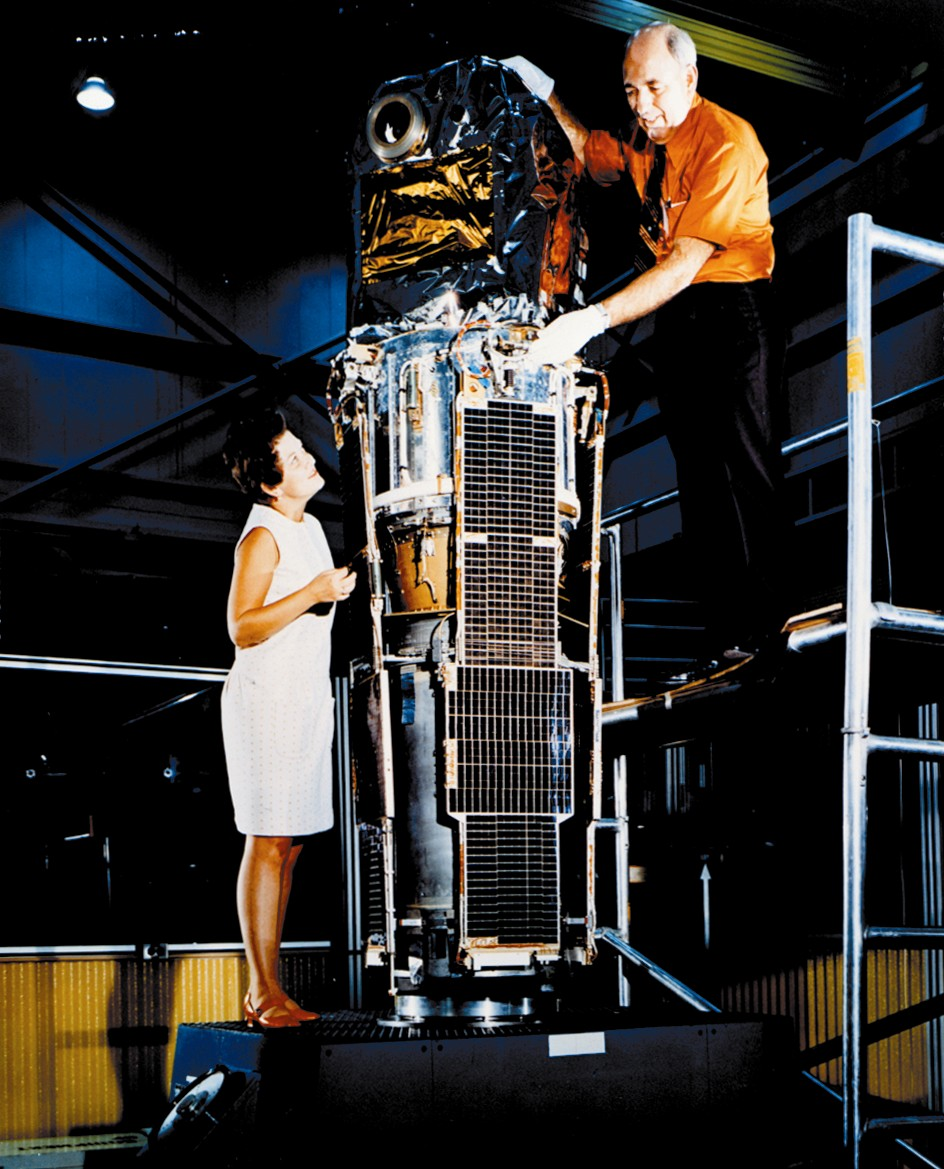
- Uhuru (X-ray Explorer Satellite)
- Mission type: Astronomy
- Operator: NASA
- COSPAR ID: 1970-107A
- SATCAT no.: 4797
- Website: heasarc.gsfc.nasa.gov/docs/uhuru/uhuru.html
- Mission duration: 3 years

Spacecraft properties
- Dry mass: 141.5 kilograms (312 lb)

Start of mission
- Launch date: 12 December 1970, 10:53:50 UTC
- Rocket: Scout B S175C
- Launch site: San Marco

End of mission
- Last contact: March 1973
- Decay date: 5 April 1979

Orbital parameters
- Reference system: Geocentric
- Regime: Low Earth
- Eccentricity: 0.002956
- Perigee altitude: 520.0 kilometers (323.1 mi)
- Apogee altitude: 560.0 kilometers (348.0 mi)
- Inclination: 3.0 degrees
- Period: 95.70 minutes
- Epoch: 12 December 1970, 05:54:00 UTC

Instruments
- All-Sky X-Ray Survey

Uhuru was the first satellite launched specifically for the purpose of X-ray astronomy. It was also known as the X-ray Explorer Satellite, SAS-A (for Small Astronomy Satellite A, the first of the three-spacecraft SAS series), SAS 1, or Explorer 42. The NASA observatory was launched on 12 December 1970 into an initial orbit of about 560 km apogee, 520 km perigee, 3 degrees inclination, with a period of 96 minutes. The mission ended in March 1973. Uhuru was a scanning mission, with a spin period of ~12 minutes. It performed the first comprehensive survey of the entire sky for X-ray sources, with a sensitivity of about 0.001 times the intensity of the Crab nebula.

== Objectives ==
The main objectives of the mission were:

- To survey the sky for cosmic X-ray sources in the 2–20 keV range to a limiting sensitivity of 1.5 × 10^{−18} joule/(cm^{2}-sec), 5 × 10^{−4} the flux from the Crab Nebula
- To determine discrete source locations with a precision of a few square minutes of arc for strong sources and a few tenths of a square degree at the sensitivity limit
- To study the structure of extended sources or complex regions with a resolution of about 30 arc minutes
- To determine gross spectral features and variability of X-ray sources
- To perform, wherever possible, coordinated and/or simultaneous observations of X-ray objects with other observers.

== Instrumentation ==
The payload consisted of two sets of proportional counters, each with ~0.084 m^{2} effective area. The counters were sensitive with more than 10% efficiency to X-ray photons in the ~2–20 keV range. The lower energy limit was determined by the attenuation of the beryllium windows of the counter plus a thin thermal shroud that was needed to maintain temperature stability of the spacecraft. The upper energy limit was determined by the transmission properties of the counter filling gas. Pulse-shape discrimination and anticoincidence techniques were used to filter out emissions of particles and undesirable high-energy photons in the background. Pulse-height analysis in eight energy channels was used to obtain information on the energy spectrum of the incident photons. The two sets of counters were placed back to back and were collimated to 0.52° × 0.52° and 5.2° × 5.2° (full width at half maximum) respectively. While the 0.52° detector gave finer angular resolution, the 5.2° detector had higher sensitivity for isolated sources.

== Results ==
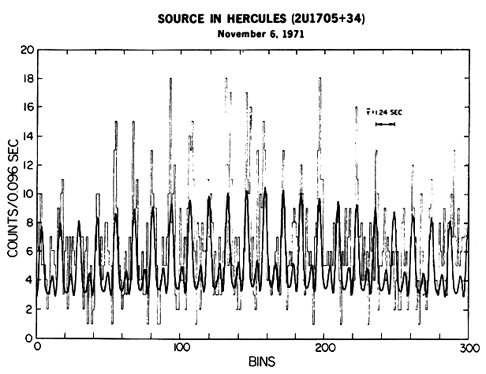
Uhuru observatotions of Her X-1

Uhuru achieved several outstanding scientific advances, including the discovery and detailed study of the pulsing accretion-powered binary X-Ray sources such as Cen X-3, Vela X-1, and Her X-1, the identification of Cygnus X-1, the first strong candidate for an astrophysical black hole, and many important extragalactic sources. The Uhuru Catalog, issued in four successive versions, the last being the 4U catalog, was the first comprehensive X-ray catalog, contains 339 objects and covers the whole sky in the 2–6 keV band. The final version of the source catalog is known as the 4U Catalog; earlier versions were the 2U and 3U catalogs. Sources are referenced as, e.g., "4U 1700-37".

== Naming ==
Uhuru means "freedom" in Swahili. It was named in recognition of the hospitality of Kenya from where it was launched, using the Italian San Marco launch platform near Mombasa.

== See also ==
- Timeline of artificial satellites and space probes
- Small Astronomy Satellite 2
- Small Astronomy Satellite 3
