= Be/X-ray binary =

Class of high-mass X-ray binaries

Be/X-ray binaries (BeXRBs or BeXBs) are a class of high-mass X-ray binaries that consist of a Be star and a neutron star. The neutron star is usually in a wide highly elliptical orbit around the Be star. The Be stellar wind forms a disk confined to a plane often different from the orbital plane of the neutron star. When the neutron star passes through the Be disk, it accretes a large mass of hot gas in a short time. As the gas falls onto the neutron star, a bright flare in hard X-rays is seen.

== Definition and classification ==
Be/X-ray binaries belong to the high-mass X-ray binary category. The optical companion is a non-supergiant, fast-rotating Be type star with emission lines indicating luminosity class III-V. Most BeXRBs have eccentric orbits and contain a neutron star, confirmed through X-ray pulsations.

BeXRBs are classified as either transient or persistent. Transient BeXRBs show two outburst types: type I outbursts are regular, periodic events occurring near periastron (the neutron star's closest orbital approach), while type II outbursts are major, unpredictable events reaching Eddington luminosity (~10^{38} erg/s for a typical neutron star) and lasting multiple orbital periods. Persistent BeXRBs display lower X-ray luminosity, more stable light curves with minor variability, slower rotating neutron stars with spin periods exceeding 200 seconds, and typically have wide, low-eccentricity orbits.

== Physical properties ==
Be stars show emission spectral lines (particularly Hα) and infrared excess from their circumstellar disk. This disk forms from material expelled by the rapidly rotating Be star. Neutron stars in BeXRBs are also fast rotators, with spin periods ranging from a few seconds to several hundred seconds. These systems display a correlation between orbital and spin periods. Neutron stars usually exhibiting pulsations in their X-ray emission due to the strong magnetic field channeling accreted gas toward the magnetic poles.

The neutron star truncates the Be star's disk through tidal forces. Evidence for this includes correlation between Hα equivalent width and orbital period, higher disk densities than in isolated Be stars, shorter V/R variability periods, and quantized infrared flux states matching resonant truncation radii. During periastron, the neutron star accretes material from the disk, causing X-ray outbursts. The disk formation and dissipation timescales correlate with the system's orbital period.

BeXRBs exist in both the Milky Way and Magellanic Clouds, with the Small Magellanic Cloud hosting many of these systems due to its lower metallicity and higher star formation rate.

== Observations ==
Observationally, identification of BeXRBs relies heavily on their optical and IR signatures, primarily emission-line spectroscopy and IR photometry. A strong correlation exists between the intensity of IR colors and Hα emission lines, suggesting a common origin in the circumstellar disk. These diagnostics assist astronomers in identifying Be star candidates associated with newly discovered X-ray sources. Techniques such as photometric color-color diagrams and narrow-slit spectroscopy are used to accurately identify these optical counterparts.

== Notable BeXRBs ==
=== X Persei ===
X Persei is a binary system containing a γ Cassiopeiae variable and a pulsar. It has a relatively long period and low eccentricity for this type of binary, which means the X-ray emission is persistent and not usually strongly variable. Some strong X-ray flares have been observed, presumably related to changes in the accretion disc, but no correlations have been found with the strong optical variations.

=== LSI+61°303 ===
LSI+61°303 is a possible example of a BeXRB. It is a periodic, radio-emitting binary system that is also the gamma-ray source, CG135+01. It is also a variable radio source characterized by periodic, non-thermal radio outbursts with a period of 26.496 d. The 26.5 d period is attributed to the eccentric orbital motion of a compact object, possibly a neutron star, around a rapidly rotating B0 Ve star. Photometric observations at optical and infrared wavelengths also show a 26.5 d modulation. Although the mass of the compact object in the LS I +61 303 system is not known accurately, it is likely that it is too large to be a neutron star and so it is likely a black hole.

Of the 20 or so members of the Be/X-ray binary class, as of 1996, only X Persei and LSI+61°303 have X-ray outbursts of much higher luminosity and harder spectrum (kT ≈ 10–20 keV) vs. (kT ≤ 1 keV). LSI+61°303 also shows strong radio outbursts, more similar to those of the "standard" short-period high-mass X-ray binaries such as SS 433, Cyg X-3 and Cir X-1.

=== RX J0209.6-7427 ===
RX J0209.6-7427 is a BeXRB located in the Magellanic Bridge. A couple of rare outbursts have been observed from this source hosting a neutron star. The last outburst was detected in 2019 after about 26 years. The accreting neutron star in this system is an ultraluminous X-ray Pulsar (ULXP) making it the second closest ULXP and the first ULXP in our neighbouring galaxy in the Magellanic Clouds.

=== Swift J010902.6-723710 ===
Swift J010902.6-723710 is a BeXRB detected by the Swift Small Magellanic Cloud (SMC) Survey (S-CUBED). An X-ray outburst, detected on October 10, 2023, had characteristics of Type I and II outbursts. Proposed orbital period is 60.623 days. Companion star of the system is "B0-0.5 star of spectral class Ve". The system's neutron star has large accretion disk.
