= Roche lobe =

Gravitationally-binding region around a star in a binary system

This is a schematic of a semidetached binary system with the larger component filling its Roche lobe (black line).

The Roche lobe is the region around a star in a binary system within which orbiting material is gravitationally bound to that star. It is an approximately teardrop-shaped region bounded by a critical gravitational equipotential, with the apex of the teardrop pointing towards the other star (the apex is at the L_{1} Lagrangian point of the system).

The Roche lobe is different from the Roche sphere, which approximates the gravitational sphere of influence of one astronomical body in the face of perturbations from a more massive body around which it orbits. It is also different from the Roche limit, which is the distance at which an object held together only by gravity begins to break up due to tidal forces. The Roche lobe, Roche limit, and Roche sphere are named after the French astronomer Édouard Roche.

== Definition ==
A three-dimensional representation of the Roche potential in a binary star with a mass ratio of 2, in the co-rotating frame. The droplet-shaped figures in the equipotential plot at the bottom of the figure define what are considered the Roche lobes of the stars. L_{1}, L_{2} and L_{3} are the Lagrangian points where forces (considered in the rotating frame) cancel out. Mass can flow through the saddle point L_{1} from one star to its companion, if the star fills its Roche lobe.

STL 3D model of the Roche potential of two orbiting bodies, rendered half as a surface and half as a mesh

In a binary system with a circular orbit, it is often useful to describe the system in a coordinate system that rotates along with the objects. In this non-inertial frame, one must consider centrifugal force in addition to gravity. The two together can be described by a potential, so that, for example, the stellar surfaces lie along equipotential surfaces.

Close to each star, surfaces of equal gravitational potential are approximately spherical and concentric with the nearer star. Far from the stellar system, the equipotentials are approximately ellipsoidal and elongated parallel to the axis joining the stellar centers. A critical equipotential intersects itself at the L_{1} Lagrangian point of the system, forming a two-lobed figure-of-eight with one of the two stars at the center of each lobe. This critical equipotential defines the Roche lobes.

Where matter moves relative to the co-rotating frame it will seem to be acted upon by a Coriolis force. This is not derivable from the Roche lobe model as the Coriolis force is a non-conservative force (i.e. not representable by a scalar potential).

== Further analysis ==
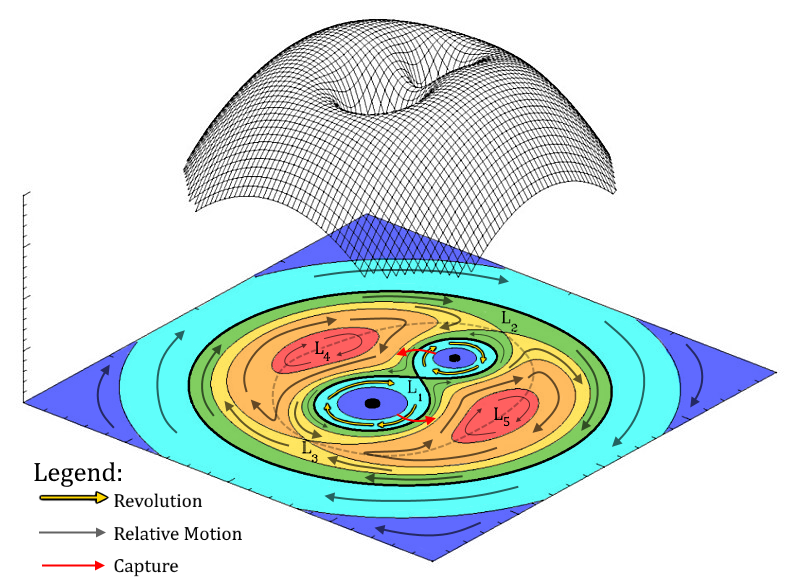
Potential array

In the gravity potential graphics, L_{1}, L_{2}, L_{3}, L_{4}, L_{5} are in synchronous rotation with the system. Regions of red, orange, yellow, green, light blue and blue are potential arrays from high to low. Red arrows are rotation of the system and black arrows are relative motions of the debris.

Debris goes faster in the lower potential region and slower in the higher potential region. So, relative motions of the debris in the lower orbit are in the same direction with the system revolution while opposite in the higher orbit.

L_{1} is the gravitational capture equilibrium point. It is a gravity cut-off point of the binary star system. It is the minimum potential equilibrium among L_{1}, L_{2}, L_{3}, L_{4} and L_{5}. It is the easiest way for the debris to commute between a Hill sphere (an inner circle of blue and light blue) and communal gravity regions (figure-eights of yellow and green in the inner side).

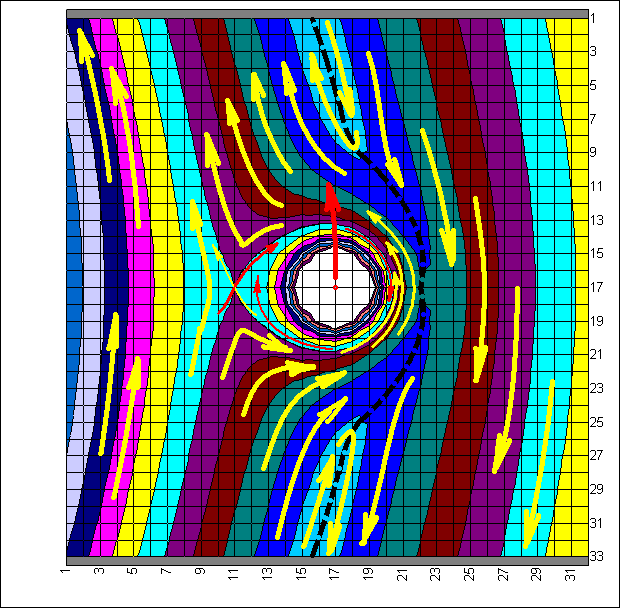
Hill sphere and horseshoe orbit

L_{2} and L_{3} are gravitational perturbation equilibria points. Passing through these two equilibrium points, debris can commute between the external region (figure-eights of yellow and green in the outer side) and the communal gravity region of the binary system.

L_{4} and L_{5} are the maximum potential points in the system. They are unstable equilibria. If the mass ratio of the two stars becomes larger, then the orange, yellow and green regions will become a horseshoe orbit.

The red region will become the tadpole orbit.

== Mass transfer ==
When a star "exceeds its Roche lobe", its surface extends out beyond its Roche lobe and the material which lies outside the Roche lobe can "fall off" into the other object's Roche lobe via the first Lagrangian point. In binary evolution this is referred to as mass transfer via Roche-lobe overflow.

In principle, mass transfer could lead to the total disintegration of the object, since a reduction of the object's mass causes its Roche lobe to shrink. However, there are several reasons why this does not happen in general. First, a reduction of the mass of the donor star may cause the donor star to shrink as well, possibly preventing such an outcome. Second, with the transfer of mass between the two binary components, angular momentum is transferred as well. While mass transfer from a more massive donor to a less massive accretor generally leads to a shrinking orbit, the reverse causes the orbit to expand (under the assumption of mass and angular-momentum conservation). The expansion of the binary orbit will lead to a less dramatic shrinkage or even expansion of the donor's Roche lobe, often preventing the destruction of the donor.

To determine the stability of the mass transfer and hence exact fate of the donor star, one needs to take into account how the radius of the donor star and that of its Roche lobe react to the mass loss from the donor; if the star expands faster than its Roche lobe or shrinks less rapidly than its Roche lobe for a prolonged time, mass transfer will be unstable and the donor star may disintegrate. If the donor star expands less rapidly or shrinks faster than its Roche lobe, mass transfer will generally be stable and may continue for a long time.

Mass transfer due to Roche-lobe overflow is responsible for a number of astronomical phenomena, including Algol systems, recurring novae (binary stars consisting of a red giant and a white dwarf that are sufficiently close that material from the red giant dribbles down onto the white dwarf), X-ray binaries and millisecond pulsars. Such mass transfer by Roche lobe overflow (RLOF) is further broken down into three distinct cases:

Case A
Case A RLOF occurs when the donor star is hydrogen burning. According to Nelson and Eggleton, there are a number of subclasses which are reproduced here:
AD dynamic
When RLOF happens to a star with a deep convection zone. Mass transfer happens rapidly on the dynamical time scale of the star and may end with a complete merger.
AR rapid contact
Similar to AD, but as the star onto which matter is rapidly accreting gains mass, it gains physical size enough for it to reach its own Roche-lobe. As such times, the system manifests as a contact binary such as a W Ursae Majoris variable.
AS slow contact
Similar to AR, but only a short period of fast mass transfer happens followed by a much longer period of slow mass transfer. Eventually the stars will come into contact, but they have changed substantially by the point this happens. Algol variables are the result of such situations.
AE early overtaking
Similar to AS, but the star gaining mass overtakes the star donating mass to evolve past the main sequence. The donor star can shrink so small to stop mass transfer, but eventually mass transfer will start again as stellar evolution continues leading to the cases
AL late overtaking
The case when the star that initially was the donor undergoes a supernova after the other star has undergone its own round of RLOF.
AB binary
The case where the stars switch back and forth between which one is undergoing RLOF at least three times (technically a subclass of the above).
AN no overtaking
The case when the star that initially was the donor undergoes a supernova before the other star reaches a RLOF phase.
AG giant
Mass transfer does not begin until the star reaches the red giant branch but before it has exhausted its hydrogen core (after which the system is described as Case B).
Case B
Case B happens when RLOF starts while the donor is a post-core hydrogen burning/hydrogen shell burning star. This case can be further subdivided into classes Br and Bc according to whether the mass transfer occurs from a star dominated by a radiation zone (Br) and therefore evolves as the situation with most Case A RLOF or a convective zone (Bc) after which a common envelope phase may occur (similar to Case C). An alternative division of cases is Ba, Bb, and Bc which are roughly corresponding to RLOF phases that happen during helium fusion, after helium fusion but before carbon fusion, or after carbon fusion in the highly evolved star.
Case C
Case C happens when RLOF starts when the donor is at or beyond the helium shell burning phase. These systems are the rarest observed, but this may be due to selection bias.

== Geometry ==
The precise shape of the Roche lobe depends on the mass ratio $q=M_{1}/M_{2}$, and must be evaluated numerically. However, for many purposes it is useful to approximate the Roche lobe as a sphere of the same volume. An approximate formula for the radius of this sphere is

$\frac{r_1}{A} = \max{[f_{1},f_{2}]}$, for $0<q<20$

where $f_{1}=0.38+0.2\log{q}$ and $f_{2}=0.46224 \left(\frac{q}{1+q}\right)^{1/3}$. Function $f_{1}$ is greater than $f_{2}$ for $q\gtrsim 0.5228$. The length A is the orbital separation of the system and r_{1} is the radius of the sphere whose volume approximates the Roche lobe of mass M_{1}. This formula is accurate to within about 2%. Another approximate formula was proposed by Eggleton and reads as follows:

$\frac{r_1}{A} = \frac{0.49q^{2/3}}{0.6q^{2/3} + \ln(1 + q^{1/3})}$.

This formula gives results up to 1% accuracy over the entire range of the mass ratio $q$.

== Sources ==
- Morris, S.L. (Feb 1994). "Two Mathematical Expansions of the Roche Equipotentials". Publications of the Astronomical Society of the Pacific. 106 (696): 154–155. Bibcode:1994PASP..106..154M. doi:10.1086/133361. JSTOR 40680260. S2CID 121386366.
- Morris, S.L. (Aug 1, 1999). "The Limits of Inclination for Binary Star Partial Eclipses". Astrophysical Journal. 520 (2): 797–804. Bibcode:1999ApJ...520..797M. doi:10.1086/307488.
