= Crab (disambiguation) =

A crab is a type of crustacean.

Crab or crabs may also refer to:

== Science and technology ==
- Crab (unit), photometrical unit of X-ray astronomy
- Crab (cipher), an encryption algorithm based on MD5
- CRAB, diagnostic criteria for multiple myeloma
- Pediculosis pubis or crabs, a pubic louse infestation
- Crab Nebula, a supernova remnant

== Arts, entertainment and media ==
=== Music ===
- Crab canon, a musical form
- Crab Records, a defunct record label
- Crab (scratch), a DJ technique
- "Crab", a song from the album Weezer by Weezer

=== Film and television ===
- The Crab (1917 film), an American silent drama film
- The Crab (2023 film), an Iranian comedy film
- Crab, a character from the animated children's television series WordWorld

=== Other arts ===
- The Crab (sculpture), by Alexander Calder

== Sports ==
- Crab (horse) (1722–1750), a British Thoroughbred racehorse
- Basket Rimini Crabs, an Italian professional basketball team based in Rimini, Emilia-Romagna
- Crab (posture) used in gymnastics, breakdancing, yoga
- Catch a crab or crab, a rowing error
- Crab, an athletic move akin to the float in breakdancing

== Other uses ==
- Crab landing, an aviation landing maneuver
- Crab, Virginia, an unincorporated community, US
- Sherman Crab, a British World War II mine-clearing tank
- Panhard CRAB, a French armoured combat vehicle
- Roger Crab (1621–1680), English soldier, haberdasher, herbal doctor and writer

== See also ==
- Krab (disambiguation)
- Cancer (disambiguation)
- Crab Island (disambiguation)
- Crabb, surname
