= Krab =

Krab or KRAB may refer to:

- Krab (surname)
- Crab stick, or krab, processed seafood
- Russian submarine Krab
- AHS Krab, a Polish 155 mm self-propelled howitzer
- KRAB, a radio station in Greenacres, California, U.S.
- KRAB, a former radio station in Seattle, Washington, U.S., whose legacy is KSER
- Krüppel associated box (KRAB), a transcription repression protein domain

== See also ==
- Crab (disambiguation)
- Mr. Krabs, a character in SpongeBob SquarePants
  - Krusty Krab, a fictional fast food restaurant
- Krabby, a Pokémon
- Krabbe disease
- Carabiner, or karabiner, a specialized type of shackle
