= 1ES 1959+650 =

BL Lac object in the constellation Draco

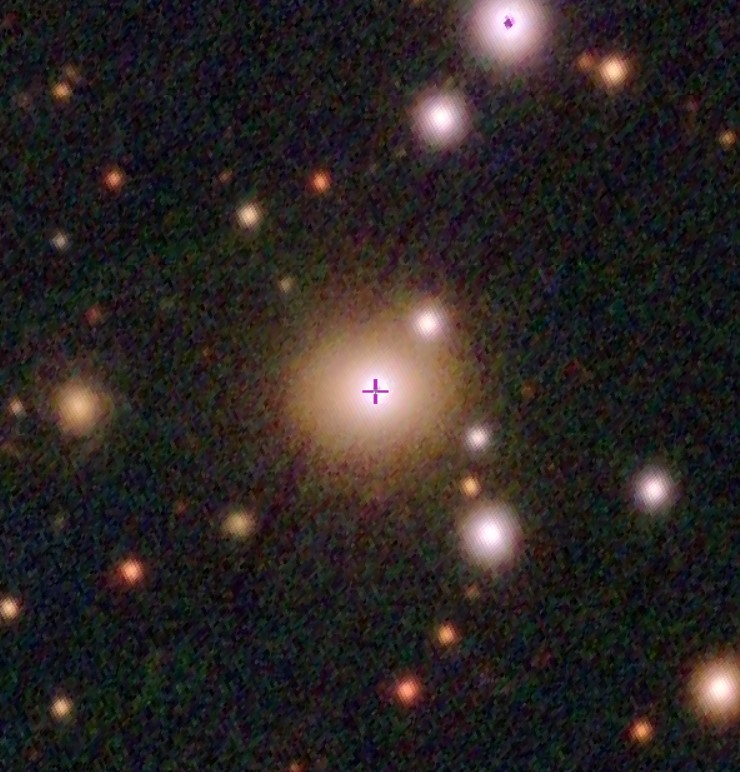
- The BL Lac object 1ES 1959+650.

Observation data (J2000 epoch)
- Constellation: Draco
- Right ascension: 19^{h} 59^{m} 59.85^{s}
- Declination: +65° 08′ 54.65″
- Redshift: 0.047000
- Heliocentric radial velocity: 14,090 km/s
- Distance: 676 Mly (207.26 Mpc)
- Apparent magnitude (V): 12.8

Characteristics
- Type: BL Lac, Flat-Spectrum Radio Source
- Apparent size (V): 37.15 kiloparsecs (121,200 light-years) (diameter; 2MASS K-band total isophote)

Other designations
- 2MASX J19595975+6508547, LEDA 2674942, NVSS J195959+650854, TXS 1959+650, TeV J1959+651

1ES 1959+650 is a BL Lacertae object or a BL Lac object located in the eastern constellation of Draco, about 676 million light years from Earth. It was first discovered as an astronomical radio source in 1987 by Green Bank Radio Telescope and further categorized as both a flat-spectrum radio source and an X-ray source during the Einstein IPC Slew Survey conducted in the early 1990s.

== Characteristics ==
1ES 1959+650 has an active galactic nucleus. It is classified as a high energy-peaked BL Lac object or a synchrotron peaked blazar with a synchrotron peak of the spectral energy distribution appearing in ultraviolet and X-ray bands.

The host galaxy of 1ES 1959+650 is a gas-rich elliptical galaxy with a dust lane located 0.8" north of its nucleus. Its structure is complex, indicating a past galaxy merger. The supermassive black hole in the center of 1ES 1959+650 is estimated to be ~ 1.3 × 10^{8} M_{☉}.

1ES 1959+650 is violently variable. It exhibits multiple outburst episodes across its electromagnetic spectrum, In its low flux state between 2000 and 2001, 1ES 1959+650 was observed with HEGRA Atmospheric Cherenkov Telescope system, which it showed a Crab flux of 5.3%. During its flaring state in May 2002, the blazar's flux level increased significantly as high as 2.2 Crab. Furthermore, an orphan flare, not accompanied by increasing activity in spectral bands, was also shown. The gamma emission in 1ES 1959+650 displays 'softer-when-brighter' evolution in a 0.1-300 GeV band while the X-ray emission showed 'harder-when-brighter' evolution in a 0.6-10 KeV band.

In addition to its variability, 1ES 1959+650 shows gamma ray flares from short to long timescales. X-ray flares were also detected in the blazar, apart from gamma ray flares. Between August 2015 and January 2016, a powerful and prolonged X-ray flare was detected in 1ES 1959+650. That same year, the second strongest X-ray flare occurred with a 5.5 month interval separation after the first flare.

The source in 1ES 1959+650 is unresolved on a kiloparsec scale. By looking at a parsec scale, it is found to be dominated by a luminous core. There is also presence of some extended unpolarized emission to the north, which the electric vector position angle is found parallel to it while the core polarization on the other hand, is roughly 1.5 percent. This suggests a component emerging towards north with average polarization of 4 percent.
