= Golden crab =

Golden crab may refer to:

- The Golden Crab, a Greek fairy tale
- Golden crab (animal), Chaceon fenneri, a species of crab

== See also ==
- Golden (disambiguation)
- Crab (disambiguation)
- Golden king crab
- Golden ghost crab
- The Crab with the Golden Claws
