= X-ray astronomy =

Branch of astronomy that uses X-ray observation

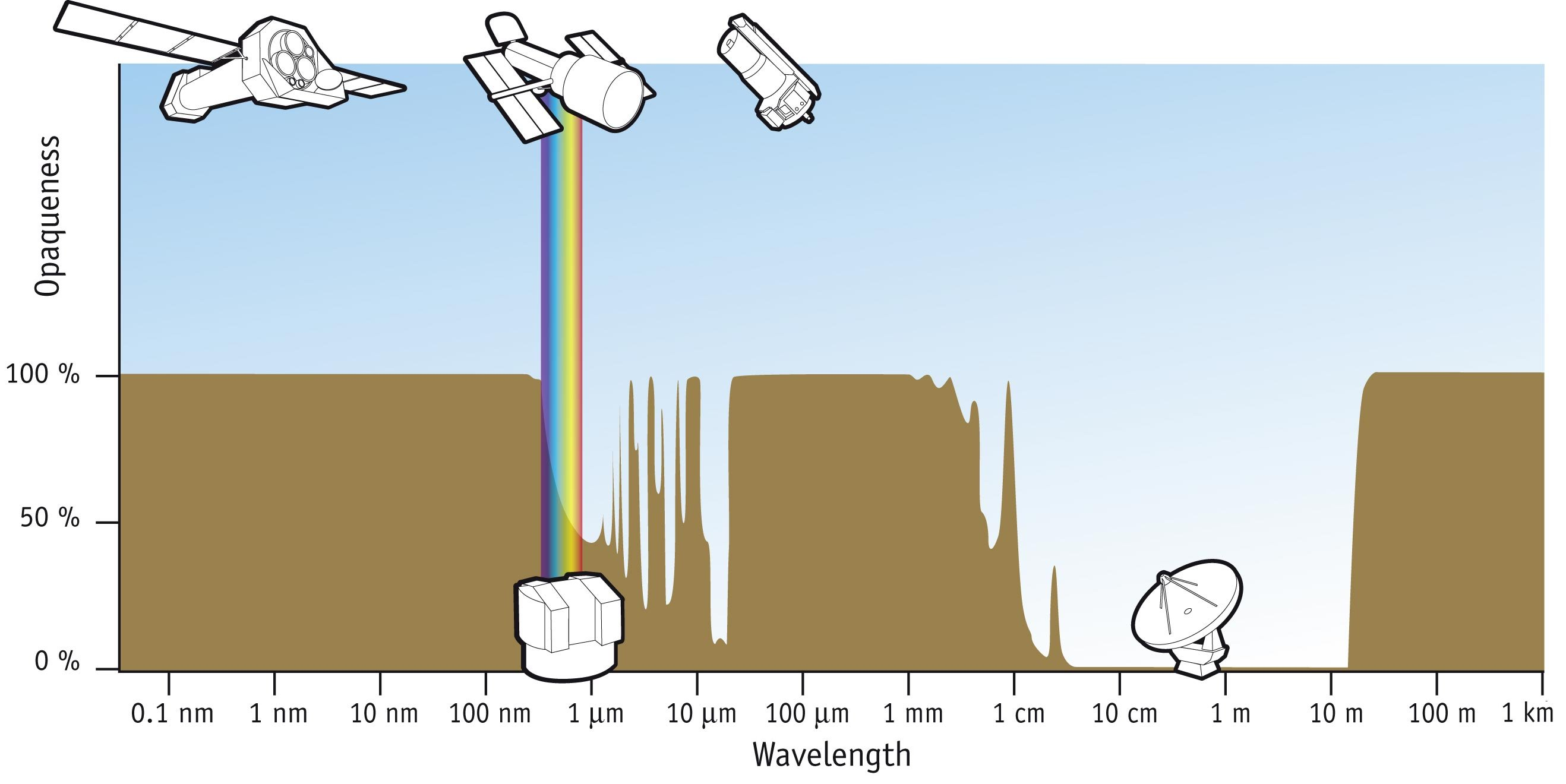
X-rays start at ~0.008 nm and extend across the electromagnetic spectrum to ~8 nm, over which the Earth's atmosphere is opaque.

X-ray astronomy is an observational branch of astronomy which deals with the study of X-ray observation and detection from astronomical objects. X-radiation is absorbed by the Earth's atmosphere, so instruments to detect X-rays must be taken to high altitude by balloons, sounding rockets, and satellites. X-ray astronomy uses a type of space telescope that can see x-ray radiation which standard optical telescopes, such as the Maunakea Observatories, cannot.

X-ray emission is expected from astronomical objects that contain extremely hot gases at temperatures from about a million kelvin (K) to hundreds of millions of kelvin (MK). Moreover, the maintenance of the E-layer of ionized gas high in the Earth's thermosphere also suggested a strong extraterrestrial source of X-rays. Although theory predicted that the Sun and the stars would be prominent X-ray sources, there was no way to verify this because Earth's atmosphere blocks most extraterrestrial X-rays. It was not until ways of sending instrument packages to high altitudes were developed that these X-ray sources could be studied.

The existence of solar X-rays was confirmed early in the mid-twentieth century by V-2s converted to sounding rockets, and the detection of extra-terrestrial X-rays has been the primary or secondary mission of multiple satellites since 1958. The first cosmic (beyond the Solar System) X-ray source was discovered by a sounding rocket in 1962. Called Scorpius X-1 (Sco X-1) (the first X-ray source found in the constellation Scorpius), the X-ray emission of Scorpius X-1 is 10,000 times greater than its visual emission, whereas that of the Sun is about a million times less. In addition, the energy output in X-rays is 100,000 times greater than the total emission of the Sun in all wavelengths.

Many thousands of X-ray sources have since been discovered. In addition, the intergalactic space in galaxy clusters is filled with a hot, but very dilute gas at a temperature between 100 and 1000 megakelvins (MK). The total amount of hot gas is five to ten times the total mass in the visible galaxies.

== History of X-ray astronomy ==
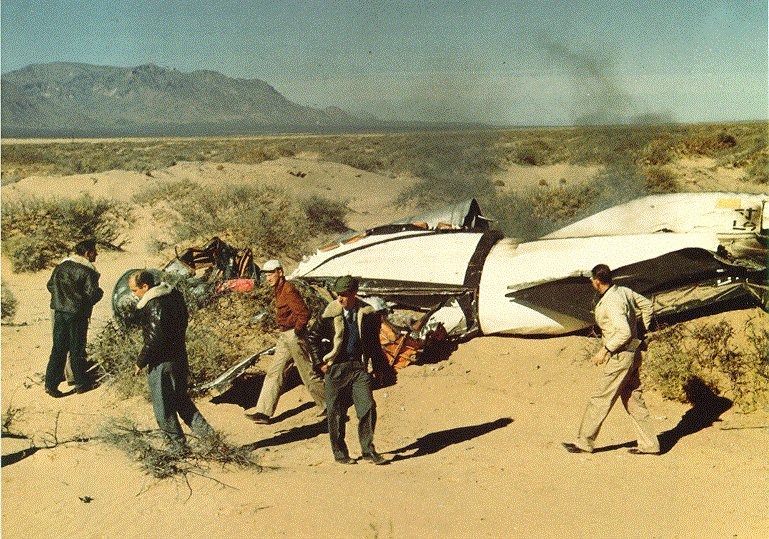
NRL scientists J. D. Purcell, C. Y. Johnson, and F. S. Johnson are among those recovering instruments from a V-2 used for upper atmospheric research above the New Mexico desert. This is V-2 number 54, launched January 18, 1951, (photo by Richard Tousey, NRL).

In 1927, E.O. Hulburt of the US Naval Research Laboratory and associates Gregory Breit and Merle A. Tuve of the Carnegie Institution of Washington explored the possibility of equipping Robert H. Goddard's rockets to explore the upper atmosphere. "Two years later, he proposed an experimental program in which a rocket might be instrumented to explore the upper atmosphere, including detection of ultraviolet radiation and X-rays at high altitudes".

In the late 1930s, the presence of a very hot, tenuous gas surrounding the Sun was inferred indirectly from optical coronal lines of highly ionized species. The Sun has been known to be surrounded by a hot tenuous corona. In the mid-1940s radio observations revealed a radio corona around the Sun.

The beginning of the search for X-ray sources from above the Earth's atmosphere was on August 5, 1948 12:07 GMT. A US Army (formerly German) V-2 rocket as part of Project Hermes was launched from White Sands Proving Grounds. The first solar X-rays were recorded by T. Burnight.

Through the 1960s, 70s, 80s, and 90s, the sensitivity of detectors increased greatly during the 60 years of X-ray astronomy. In addition, the ability to focus X-rays has developed enormously—allowing the production of high-quality images of many fascinating celestial objects.

== Observational platforms ==
=== Sounding rocket flights ===
The first sounding rocket flights for X-ray research were accomplished at the White Sands Missile Range in New Mexico with a V-2 rocket on January 28, 1949. A detector was placed in the nose cone section and the rocket was launched in a suborbital flight to an altitude just above the atmosphere. X-rays from the Sun were detected by the U.S. Naval Research Laboratory Blossom experiment on board.

An Aerobee 150 rocket launched on June 19, 1962 (UTC) detected the first X-rays emitted from a source outside the Solar System (Scorpius X-1). It is now known that such X-ray sources as Sco X-1 are compact stars, such as neutron stars or black holes. Material falling into a black hole may emit X-rays, but the black hole itself does not. The energy source for the X-ray emission is gravity. Infalling gas and dust is heated by the strong gravitational fields of these and other celestial objects. Based on discoveries in this new field of X-ray astronomy, starting with Scorpius X-1, Riccardo Giacconi received the Nobel Prize in Physics in 2002.

The largest drawback to rocket flights is their very short duration (just a few minutes above the atmosphere before the rocket falls back to Earth) and their limited field of view. A rocket launched from the United States will not be able to see sources in the southern sky; a rocket launched from Australia will not be able to see sources in the northern sky.

==== X-ray Quantum Calorimeter (XQC) project ====
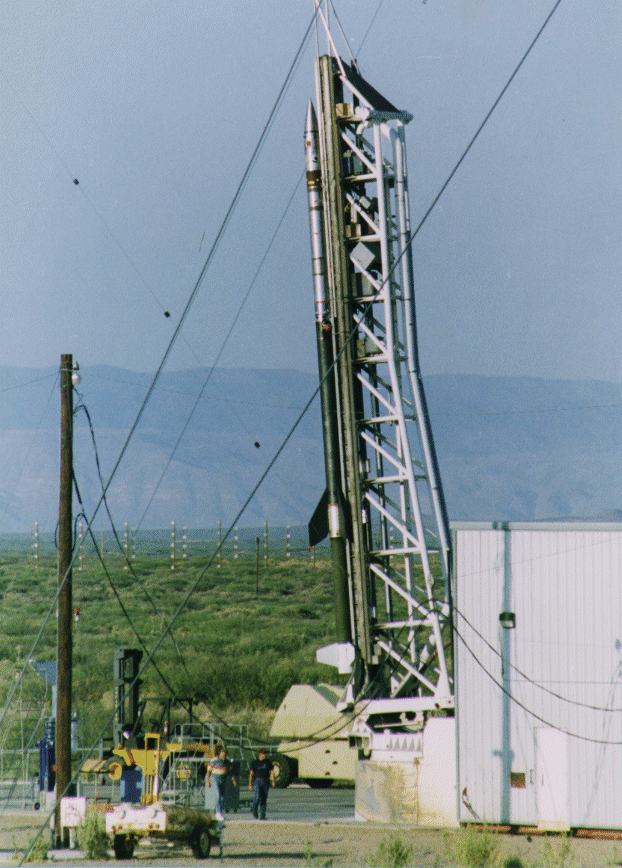
A launch of the Black Brant 8 Microcalorimeter (XQC-2) at the turn of the century is a part of the joint undertaking by the University of Wisconsin–Madison and NASA's Goddard Space Flight Center known as the X-ray Quantum Calorimeter (XQC) project.

In astronomy, the interstellar medium (or ISM) is the gas and cosmic dust that pervade interstellar space: the matter that exists between the star systems within a galaxy. It fills interstellar space and blends smoothly into the surrounding intergalactic medium. The interstellar medium consists of an extremely dilute (by terrestrial standards) mixture of ions, atoms, molecules, larger dust grains, cosmic rays, and (galactic) magnetic fields. The energy that occupies the same volume, in the form of electromagnetic radiation, is the interstellar radiation field.

Of interest is the hot ionized medium (HIM) consisting of a coronal cloud ejection from star surfaces at 10^{6}-10^{7} K which emits X-rays. The ISM is turbulent and full of structure on all spatial scales. Stars are born deep inside large complexes of molecular clouds, typically a few parsecs in size. During their lives and deaths, stars interact physically with the ISM. Stellar winds from young clusters of stars (often with giant or supergiant HII regions surrounding them) and shock waves created by supernovae inject enormous amounts of energy into their surroundings, which leads to hypersonic turbulence. The resultant structures are stellar wind bubbles and superbubbles of hot gas. The Sun is currently traveling through the Local Interstellar Cloud, a denser region in the low-density Local Bubble.

To measure the spectrum of the diffuse X-ray emission from the interstellar medium over the energy range 0.07 to 1 keV, NASA launched a Black Brant 9 from White Sands Missile Range, New Mexico on May 1, 2008. The Principal Investigator for the mission is Dr. Dan McCammon of the University of Wisconsin–Madison.

=== Balloons ===
Balloon flights can carry instruments to altitudes of up to 40 km above sea level, where they are above as much as 99.997% of the Earth's atmosphere. Unlike a rocket where data are collected during a brief few minutes, balloons are able to stay aloft for much longer. However, even at such altitudes, much of the X-ray spectrum is still absorbed. X-rays with energies less than 35 keV (5,600 aJ) cannot reach balloons. On July 21, 1964, the Crab Nebula supernova remnant was discovered to be a hard X-ray (15–60 keV) source by a scintillation counter flown on a balloon launched from Palestine, Texas, United States. This was likely the first balloon-based detection of X-rays from a discrete cosmic X-ray source.

==== High-energy focusing telescope ====
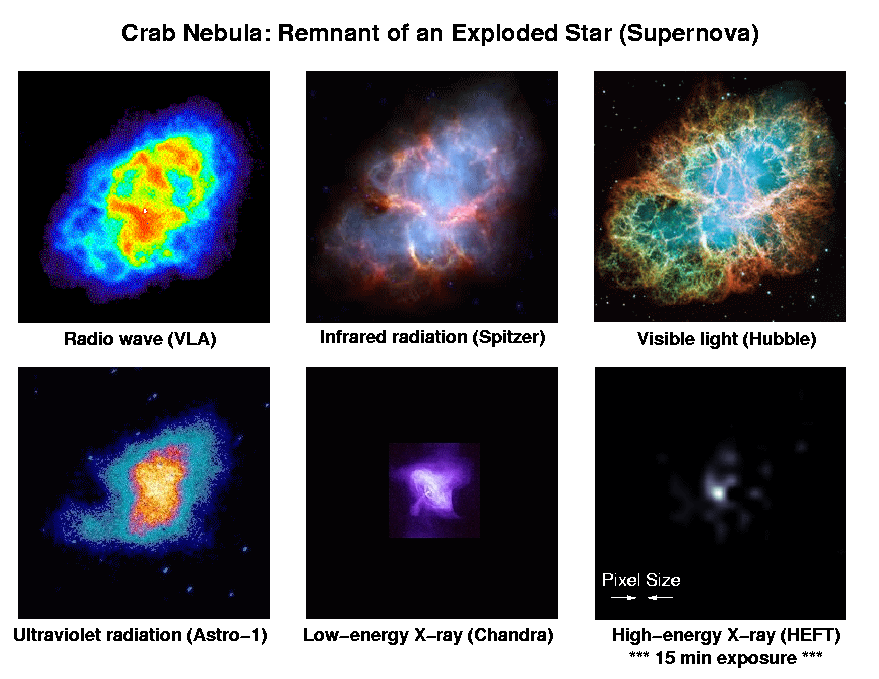
The Crab Nebula is a remnant of an exploded star. This image shows the Crab Nebula in various energy bands, including a hard X-ray image from the HEFT data taken during its 2005 observation run. Each image is 6′ wide.

The high-energy focusing telescope (HEFT) is a balloon-borne experiment to image astrophysical sources in the hard X-ray (20–100 keV) band. Its maiden flight took place in May 2005 from Fort Sumner, New Mexico, USA. The angular resolution of HEFT is c. 1.5'. Rather than using a grazing-angle X-ray telescope, HEFT makes use of a novel tungsten-silicon multilayer coatings to extend the reflectivity of nested grazing-incidence mirrors beyond 10 keV. HEFT has an energy resolution of 1.0 keV full width at half maximum at 60 keV. HEFT was launched for a 25-hour balloon flight in May 2005. The instrument performed within specification and observed Tau X-1, the Crab Nebula.

==== High-resolution gamma-ray and hard X-ray spectrometer (HIREGS) ====
A balloon-borne experiment called the High-resolution gamma-ray and hard X-ray spectrometer (HIREGS) observed X-ray and gamma-rays emissions from the Sun and other astronomical objects. It was launched from McMurdo Station, Antarctica in December 1991 and 1992. Steady winds carried the balloon on a circumpolar flight lasting about two weeks each time.

=== Rockoons ===
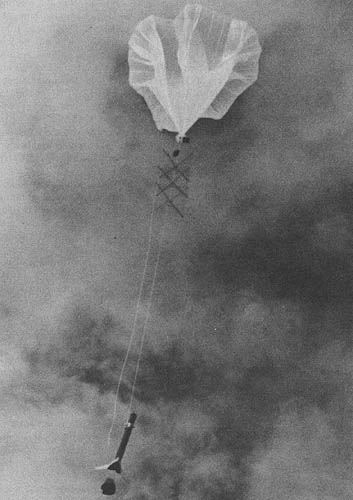
Navy Deacon rockoon photographed just after a shipboard launch in July 1956

The rockoon, a blend of rocket and balloon, was a solid-fuel rocket that, rather than being immediately lit while on the ground, was first carried into the upper atmosphere by a gas-filled balloon. Then, once separated from the balloon at its maximum height, the rocket was automatically ignited. This achieved a higher altitude, since the rocket did not have to move through the lower thicker air layers that would have required much more chemical fuel.

The original concept of "rockoons" was developed by Cmdr. Lee Lewis, Cmdr. G. Halvorson, S. F. Singer, and James A. Van Allen during the Aerobee rocket firing cruise of the USS Norton Sound on March 1, 1949.

=== Satellite observations ===
The orbiting of satellites with solar X-ray sensors provided the opportunity for continuous, long-term observation. The first such experiments, on Vanguard 3 and Explorer 7, failed as they were under-calibrated and quickly became saturated. SOLRAD 1, launched in 1960, was the first satellite to succeed in measuring solar X-rays.

== Instruments ==
=== X-ray telescopes and mirrors ===
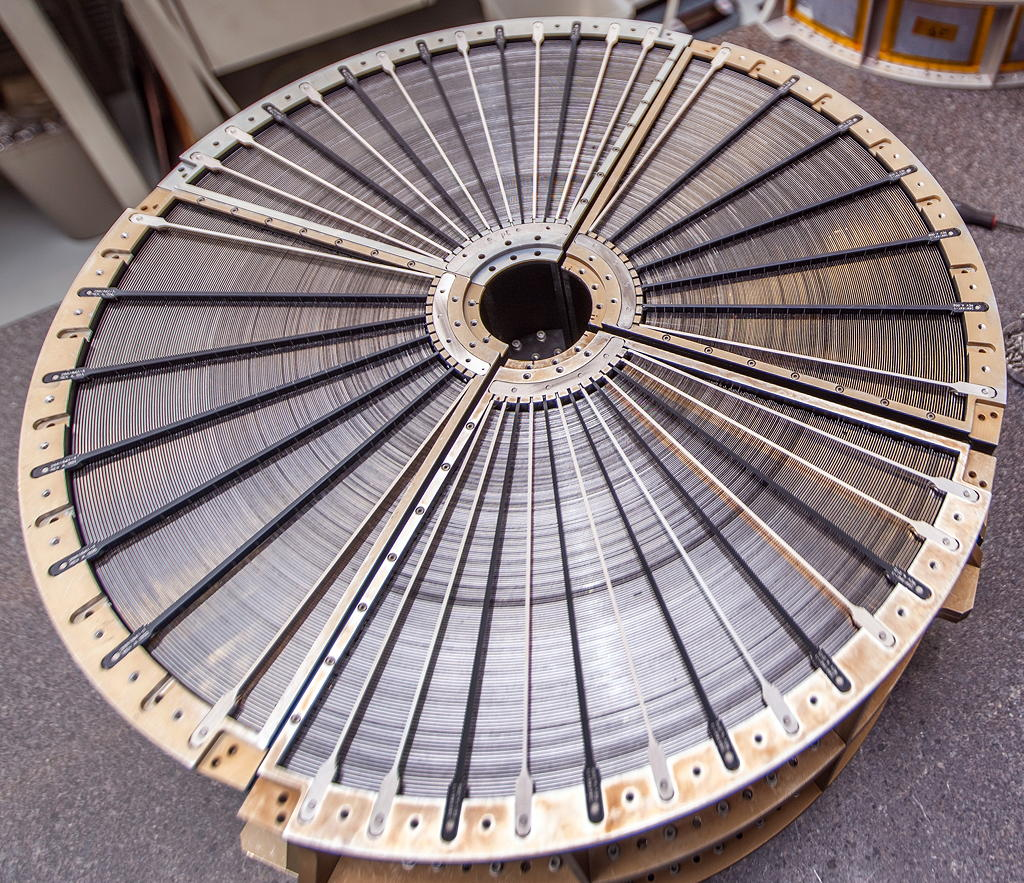
One of the mirrors of XRISM made of 203 foils

Satellites are needed because X-rays are absorbed by the Earth's atmosphere, so instruments to detect X-rays must be taken to high altitude by balloons, sounding rockets, and satellites. X-ray telescopes (XRTs) have varying directionality or imaging ability based on glancing angle reflection rather than refraction or large deviation reflection. This limits them to much narrower fields of view than visible or UV telescopes. The mirrors can be made of ceramic or metal foil.

The first X-ray telescope in astronomy was used to observe the Sun. The first X-ray picture (taken with a grazing incidence telescope) of the Sun was taken in 1963, by a rocket-borne telescope. On April 19, 1960, the very first X-ray image of the sun was taken using a pinhole camera on an Aerobee-Hi rocket.

The utilization of X-ray mirrors for extrasolar X-ray astronomy simultaneously requires:

- the ability to determine the location at the arrival of an X-ray photon in two dimensions and
- a reasonable detection efficiency.

=== X-ray astronomy detectors ===
X-ray astronomy detectors have been designed and configured primarily for energy and occasionally for wavelength detection using a variety of techniques usually limited to the technology of the time.

X-ray detectors collect individual X-rays (photons of X-ray electromagnetic radiation) and count the number of photons collected (intensity), the energy (0.12 to 120 keV) of the photons collected, wavelength (c. 0.008–8 nm), or how fast the photons are detected (counts per hour), to tell us about the object that is emitting them.

== Astrophysical sources of X-rays ==
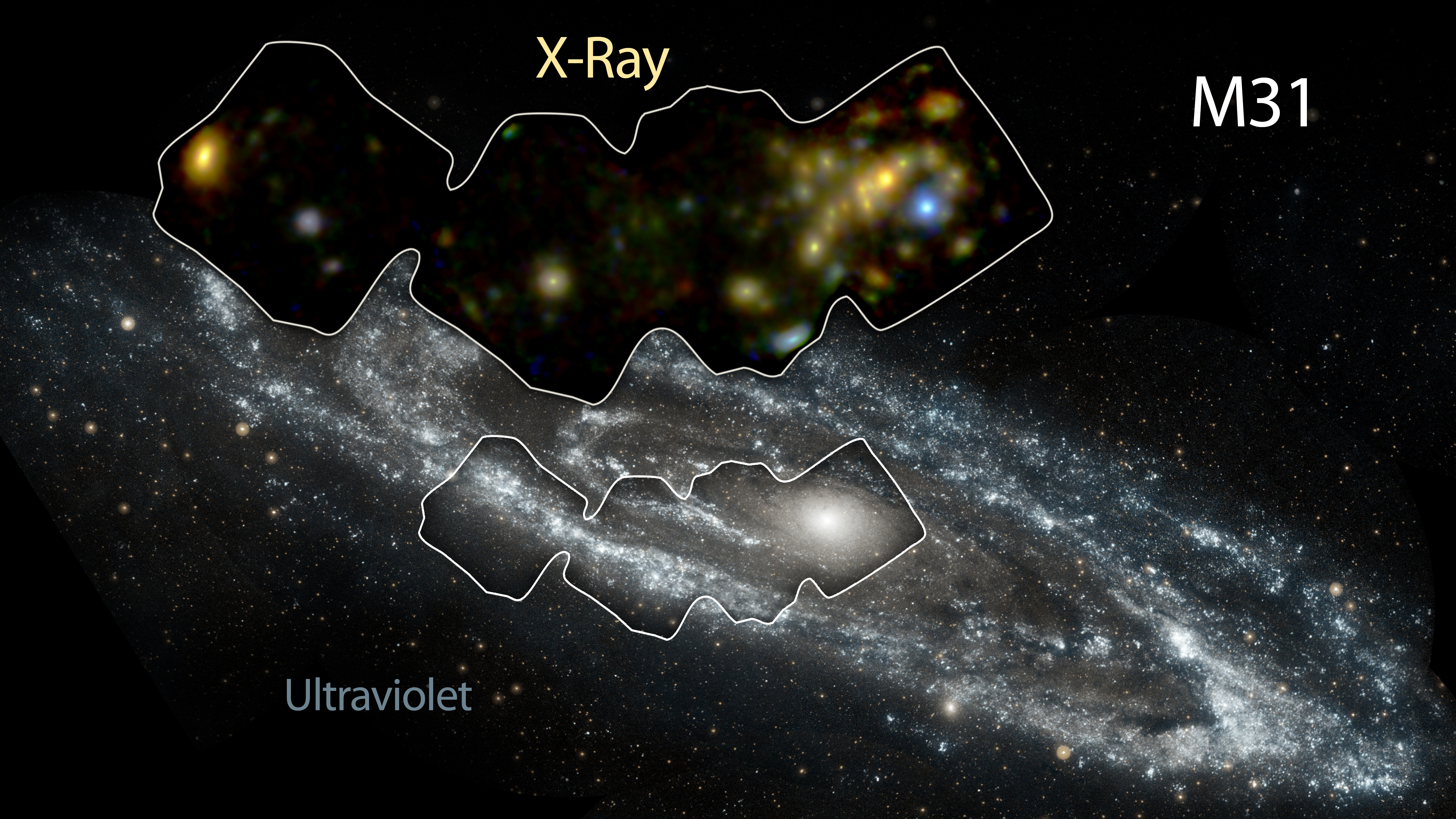
Andromeda Galaxy – in high-energy X-ray and ultraviolet light (released 5 January 2016).

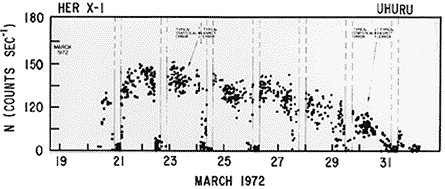
This light curve of Her X-1 shows long term and medium term variability. Each pair of vertical lines delineate the eclipse of the compact object behind its companion star. In this case, the companion is a two solar-mass star with a radius of nearly four times that of the Sun. This eclipse shows us the orbital period of the system, 1.7 days.

Several types of astrophysical objects emit, fluoresce, or reflect X-rays, from galaxy clusters, through black holes in active galactic nuclei (AGN) to galactic objects such as supernova remnants, stars, and binary stars containing a white dwarf (cataclysmic variable stars and super soft X-ray sources), neutron star or black hole (X-ray binaries). Some Solar System bodies emit X-rays, the most notable being the Moon, although most of the X-ray brightness of the Moon arises from reflected solar X-rays. A combination of many unresolved X-ray sources is thought to produce the observed X-ray background. The X-ray continuum can arise from bremsstrahlung, black-body radiation, synchrotron radiation, or what is called inverse Compton scattering of lower-energy photons by relativistic electrons, knock-on collisions of fast protons with atomic electrons, and atomic recombination, with or without additional electron transitions.

An intermediate-mass X-ray binary (IMXB) is a binary star system where one of the components is a neutron star or a black hole. The other component is an intermediate mass star.

Hercules X-1 is composed of a neutron star accreting matter from a normal star (HZ Herculis) probably due to Roche lobe overflow. X-1 is the prototype for the massive X-ray binaries although it falls on the borderline, ~2 M_{☉}, between high- and low-mass X-ray binaries.

In July 2020, astronomers reported the observation of a "hard tidal disruption event candidate" associated with ASASSN-20hx, located near the nucleus of galaxy NGC 6297, and noted that the observation represented one of the "very few tidal disruption events with hard powerlaw X-ray spectra".

== Celestial X-ray sources ==
The celestial sphere has been divided into 88 constellations. The International Astronomical Union (IAU) constellations are areas of the sky. Each of these contains remarkable X-ray sources. Some of them have been identified from astrophysical modeling to be galaxies or black holes at the centers of galaxies. Some are pulsars. As with sources already successfully modeled by X-ray astrophysics, striving to understand the generation of X-rays by the apparent source helps to understand the Sun, the universe as a whole, and how these affect us on Earth. Constellations are an astronomical device for handling observation and precision independent of current physical theory or interpretation. Astronomy has been around for a long time. Physical theory changes with time. With respect to celestial X-ray sources, X-ray astrophysics tends to focus on the physical reason for X-ray brightness, whereas X-ray astronomy tends to focus on their classification, order of discovery, variability, resolvability, and their relationship with nearby sources in other constellations.

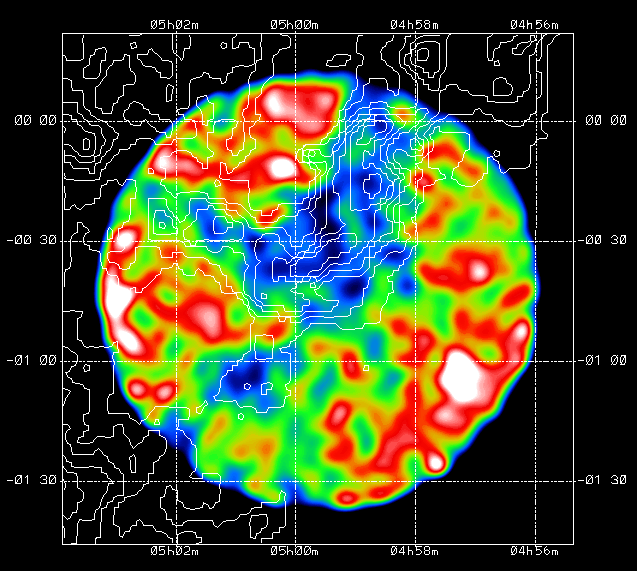
This ROSAT PSPC false-color image is of a portion of a nearby stellar wind superbubble (the Orion–Eridanus Superbubble) stretching across Eridanus and Orion.

Within the constellations Orion and Eridanus and stretching across them is a soft X-ray "hot spot" known as the Orion–Eridanus Superbubble, the Eridanus Soft X-ray Enhancement, or simply the Eridanus Bubble, a 25° area of interlocking arcs of Hα emitting filaments. Soft X-rays are emitted by hot gas (T ~ 2–3 MK) in the interior of the superbubble. This bright object forms the background for the "shadow" of a filament of gas and dust. The filament is shown by the overlaid contours, which represent 100 micrometre emission from dust at a temperature of about 30 K as measured by IRAS. Here the filament absorbs soft X-rays between 100 and 300 eV, indicating that the hot gas is located behind the filament. This filament may be part of a shell of neutral gas that surrounds the hot bubble. Its interior is energized by ultraviolet (UV) light and stellar winds from hot stars in the Orion OB1 association. These stars energize a superbubble about 1200 lys across which is observed in the visual (Hα) and X-ray portions of the spectrum.

== Explorational X-ray astronomy ==
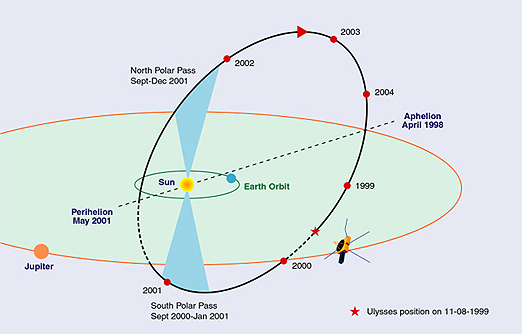
Ulysses' second orbit: it arrived at Jupiter on February 8, 1992, for a swing-by maneuver that increased its inclination to the ecliptic by 80.2 degrees.

Usually observational astronomy is considered to occur on Earth's surface (or beneath it in neutrino astronomy). The idea of limiting observation to Earth includes orbiting the Earth. As soon as the observer leaves the cozy confines of Earth, the observer becomes a deep space explorer. Except for Explorer 1 and Explorer 3 and the earlier satellites in the series, usually if a probe is going to be a deep space explorer it leaves the Earth or an orbit around the Earth.

For a satellite or space probe to qualify as a deep space X-ray astronomer/explorer or "astronobot"/explorer, all it needs to carry aboard is an XRT or X-ray detector and leave Earth's orbit.

Ulysses was launched October 6, 1990, and reached Jupiter for its "gravitational slingshot" in February 1992. It passed the south solar pole in June 1994 and crossed the ecliptic equator in February 1995. The solar X-ray and cosmic gamma-ray burst experiment (GRB) had 3 main objectives: study and monitor solar flares, detect and localize cosmic gamma-ray bursts, and in-situ detection of Jovian aurorae. Ulysses was the first satellite carrying a gamma burst detector which went outside the orbit of Mars. The hard X-ray detectors operated in the range 15–150 keV. The detectors consisted of 23-mm thick × 51-mm diameter CsI(Tl) crystals mounted via plastic light tubes to photomultipliers. The hard detector changed its operating mode depending on (1) measured count rate, (2) ground command, or (3) change in spacecraft telemetry mode. The trigger level was generally set for 8-sigma above background and the sensitivity is 10^{−6} erg/cm^{2} (1 nJ/m^{2}). When a burst trigger is recorded, the instrument switches to record high resolution data, recording it to a 32-kbit memory for a slow telemetry read out. Burst data consist of either 16 s of 8-ms resolution count rates or 64 s of 32-ms count rates from the sum of the 2 detectors. There were also 16 channel energy spectra from the sum of the 2 detectors (taken either in 1, 2, 4, 16, or 32 second integrations). During 'wait' mode, the data were taken either in 0.25 or 0.5 s integrations and 4 energy channels (with shortest integration time being 8 s). Again, the outputs of the 2 detectors were summed.

The Ulysses soft X-ray detectors consisted of 2.5-mm thick × 0.5 cm^{2} area Si surface barrier detectors. A 100 mg/cm^{2} beryllium foil front window rejected the low energy X-rays and defined a conical FOV of 75° (half-angle). These detectors were passively cooled and operate in the temperature range −35 to −55 °C. This detector had 6 energy channels, covering the range 5–20 keV.

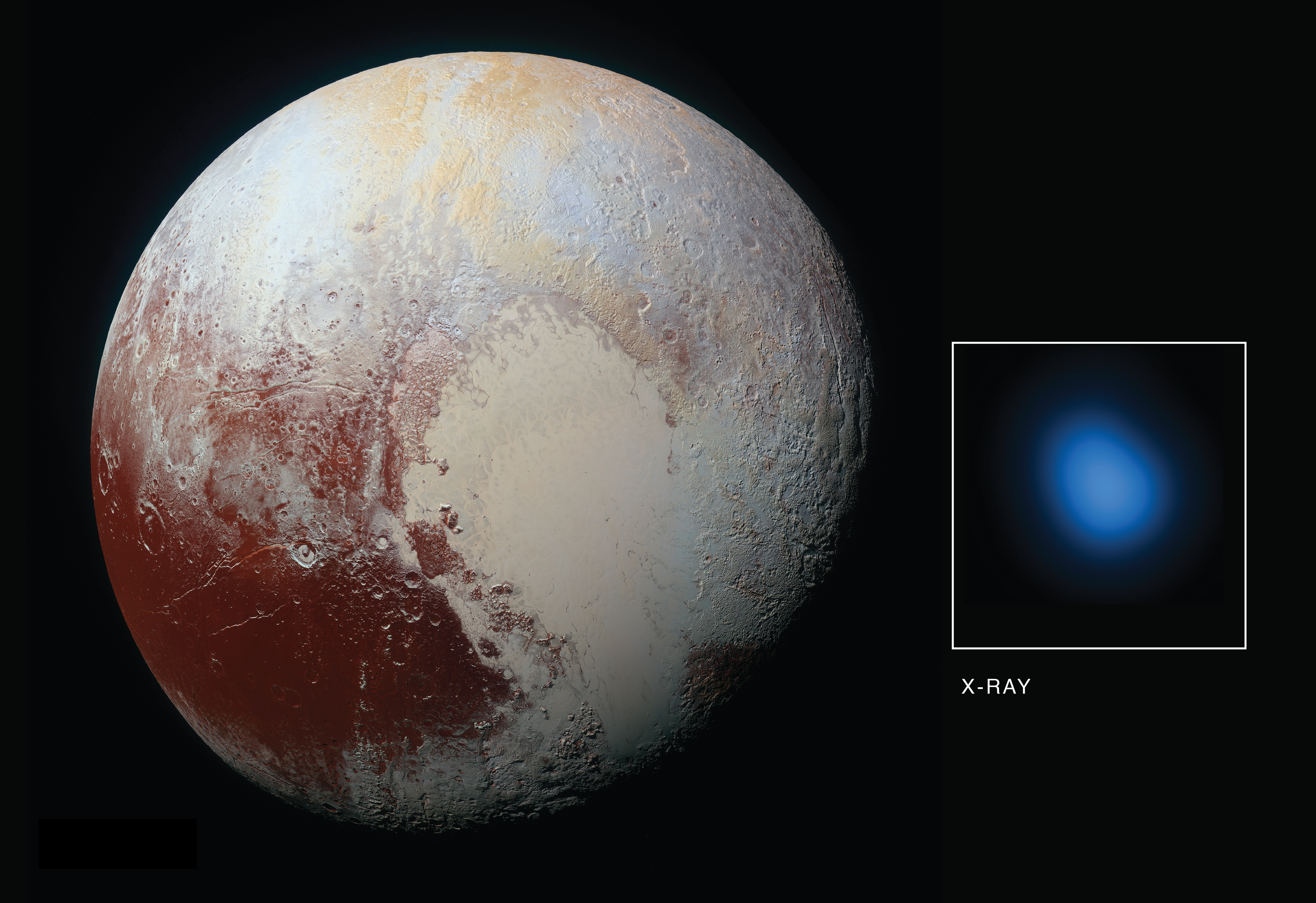
X-Rays from Pluto

=== Dynamos ===
Dynamo theory describes the process through which a rotating, convecting, and electrically conducting fluid acts to maintain a magnetic field. This theory is used to explain the presence of anomalously long-lived magnetic fields in astrophysical bodies. If some of the stellar magnetic fields are really induced by dynamos, then field strength might be associated with rotation rate.

=== Astronomical models ===
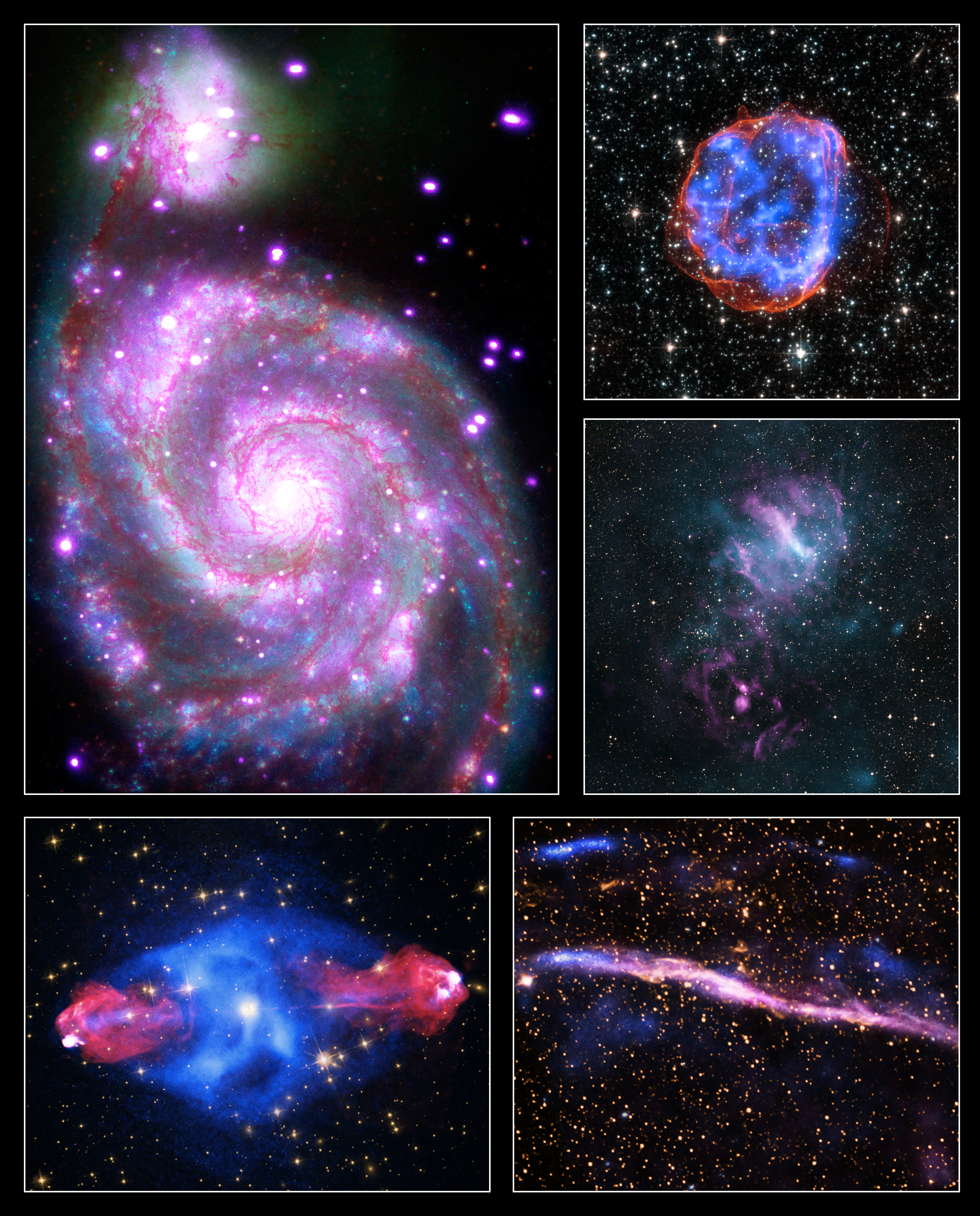
Images released to celebrate the International Year of Light 2015 (Chandra X-Ray Observatory).

From the observed X-ray spectrum, combined with spectral emission results for other wavelength ranges, an astronomical model addressing the likely source of X-ray emission can be constructed. For example, with Scorpius X-1 the X-ray spectrum steeply drops off as X-ray energy increases up to 20 keV, which is likely for a thermal-plasma mechanism. In addition, there is no radio emission, and the visible continuum is roughly what would be expected from a hot plasma fitting the observed X-ray flux. The plasma could be a coronal cloud of a central object or a transient plasma, where the energy source is unknown, but could be related to the idea of a close binary.

In the Crab Nebula X-ray spectrum there are three features that differ greatly from Scorpius X-1: its spectrum is much harder, its source diameter is in light-years (ly)s, not astronomical units (AU), and its radio and optical synchrotron emission are strong. Its overall X-ray luminosity rivals the optical emission and could be that of a nonthermal plasma. However, the Crab Nebula appears as an X-ray source that is a central freely expanding ball of dilute plasma, where the energy content is 100 times the total energy content of the large visible and radio portion, obtained from the unknown source.

The "Dividing Line" as giant stars evolve to become red giants also coincides with the Wind and Coronal Dividing Lines. To explain the drop in X-ray emission across these dividing lines, a number of models have been proposed:

1. low transition region densities, leading to low emission in coronae,
2. high-density wind extinction of coronal emission,
3. only cool coronal loops become stable,
4. changes in a magnetic field structure to that an open topology, leading to a decrease of magnetically confined plasma, or
5. changes in the magnetic dynamo character, leading to the disappearance of stellar fields leaving only small-scale, turbulence-generated fields among red giants.

== Analytical X-ray astronomy ==
High-mass X-ray binaries (HMXBs) are composed of OB supergiant companion stars and compact objects, usually neutron stars (NS) or black holes (BH). Supergiant X-ray binaries (SGXBs) are HMXBs in which the compact objects orbit massive companions with orbital periods of a few days (3–15 d), and in circular (or slightly eccentric) orbits. SGXBs show typical the hard X-ray spectra of accreting pulsars and most show strong absorption as obscured HMXBs. X-ray luminosity (L_{x}) increases up to 10^{36} erg·s^{−1} (10^{29} watts).

The mechanism triggering the different temporal behavior observed between the classical SGXBs and the recently discovered supergiant fast X-ray transients (SFXT)s is still debated.

== Stellar X-ray astronomy ==
The first detection of stellar x-rays occurred on April 5, 1974, with the detection of X-rays from Capella. A rocket flight on that date briefly calibrated its attitude control system when a star sensor pointed the payload axis at Capella (α Aur). During this period, X-rays in the range 0.2–1.6 keV were detected by an X-ray reflector system co-aligned with the star sensor. The X-ray luminosity of L_{x} = 10^{31} erg·s^{−1} (10^{24} W) is four orders of magnitude above the Sun's X-ray luminosity.

=== Stellar coronae ===
Coronal stars, or stars within a coronal cloud, are ubiquitous among the stars in the cool half of the Hertzsprung–Russell diagram. Experiments with instruments aboard Skylab and Copernicus have been used to search for soft X-ray emission in the energy range ~0.14–0.284 keV from stellar coronae. The experiments aboard ANS succeeded in finding X-ray signals from Capella and Sirius (α CMa). X-ray emission from an enhanced solar-like corona was proposed for the first time. The high temperature of Capella's corona as obtained from the first coronal X-ray spectrum of Capella using HEAO 1 required magnetic confinement unless it was a free-flowing coronal wind.

In 1977 Proxima Centauri is discovered to be emitting high-energy radiation in the XUV. In 1978, α Cen was identified as a low-activity coronal source. With the operation of the Einstein observatory, X-ray emission was recognized as a characteristic feature common to a wide range of stars covering essentially the whole Hertzsprung–Russell diagram. The Einstein initial survey led to significant insights:

- X-ray sources abound among all types of stars, across the Hertzsprung–Russell diagram and across most stages of evolution,
- the X-ray luminosities and their distribution along the main sequence were not in agreement with the long-favored acoustic heating theories, but were now interpreted as the effect of magnetic coronal heating, and
- stars that are otherwise similar reveal large differences in their X-ray output if their rotation period is different.

To fit the medium-resolution spectrum of UX Arietis, subsolar abundances were required.

Stellar X-ray astronomy is contributing toward a deeper understanding of

- magnetic fields in magnetohydrodynamic dynamos,
- the release of energy in tenuous astrophysical plasmas through various plasma-physical processes, and
- the interactions of high-energy radiation with the stellar environment.

Current wisdom has it that the massive coronal main sequence stars are late-A or early F stars, a conjecture that is supported both by observation and by theory.

=== Young, low-mass stars ===
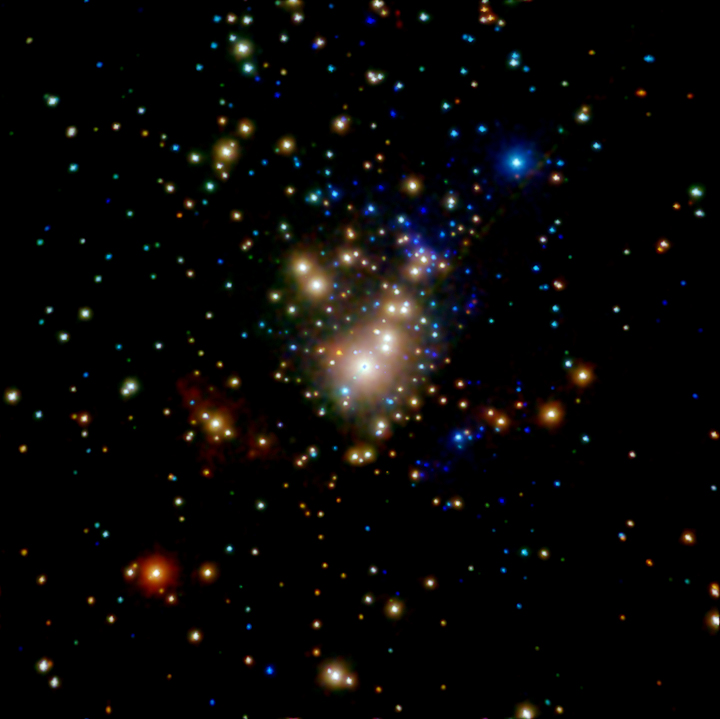
A Chandra X-ray image of the Cluster of newly formed stars in the Orion Nebula

Newly formed stars are known as pre-main-sequence stars during the stage of stellar evolution before they reach the main-sequence. Stars in this stage (ages <10 million years) produce X-rays in their stellar coronae. However, their X-ray emission is 10^{3} to 10^{5} times stronger than for main-sequence stars of similar masses.

X-ray emission for pre–main-sequence stars was discovered by the Einstein Observatory. This X-ray emission is primarily produced by magnetic reconnection flares in the stellar coronae, with many small flares contributing to the "quiescent" X-ray emission from these stars. Pre–main sequence stars have large convection zones, which in turn drive strong dynamos, producing strong surface magnetic fields. This leads to the high X-ray emission from these stars, which lie in the saturated X-ray regime, unlike main-sequence stars that show rotational modulation of X-ray emission. Other sources of X-ray emission include accretion hotspots and collimated outflows.

X-ray emission as an indicator of stellar youth is important for studies of star-forming regions. Most star-forming regions in the Milky Way Galaxy are projected on Galactic-Plane fields with numerous unrelated field stars. It is often impossible to distinguish members of a young stellar cluster from field-star contaminants using optical and infrared images alone. X-ray emission can easily penetrate moderate absorption from molecular clouds, and can be used to identify candidate cluster members.

=== Unstable winds ===
Given the lack of a significant outer convection zone, theory predicts the absence of a magnetic dynamo in earlier A stars. In early stars of spectral type O and B, shocks developing in unstable winds are the likely source of X-rays.

=== Coolest M dwarfs ===
Beyond spectral type M5, the classical αω dynamo can no longer operate as the internal structure of dwarf stars changes significantly: they become fully convective. As a distributed (or α^{2}) dynamo may become relevant, both the magnetic flux on the surface and the topology of the magnetic fields in the corona should systematically change across this transition, perhaps resulting in some discontinuities in the X-ray characteristics around spectral class dM5. However, observations do not seem to support this picture: long-time lowest-mass X-ray detection, VB 8 (M7e V), has shown steady emission at levels of X-ray luminosity (L_{X}) ≈ 10^{26} erg·s^{−1} (10^{19} W) and flares up to an order of magnitude higher. Comparison with other late M dwarfs shows a rather continuous trend.

=== Strong X-ray emission from Herbig Ae/Be stars ===
Herbig Ae/Be stars are pre-main sequence stars. As to their X-ray emission properties, some are

- reminiscent of hot stars,
- others point to coronal activity as in cool stars, in particular the presence of flares and very high temperatures.

The nature of these strong emissions has remained controversial with models including

- unstable stellar winds,
- colliding winds,
- magnetic coronae,
- disk coronae,
- wind-fed magnetospheres,
- accretion shocks,
- the operation of a shear dynamo,
- the presence of unknown late-type companions.

=== K giants ===
The FK Com stars are giants of spectral type K with an unusually rapid rotation and signs of extreme activity. Their X-ray coronae are among the most luminous (L_{X} ≥ 10^{32} erg·s^{−1} or 10^{25} W) and the hottest known with dominant temperatures up to 40 MK. However, the current popular hypothesis involves a merger of a close binary system in which the orbital angular momentum of the companion is transferred to the primary.

Pollux is the brightest star in the constellation Gemini, despite its Beta designation, and the 17th brightest in the sky. Pollux is a giant orange K star that makes an interesting color contrast with its white "twin", Castor. Evidence has been found for a hot, outer, magnetically supported corona around Pollux, and the star is known to be an X-ray emitter.

=== Eta Carinae ===
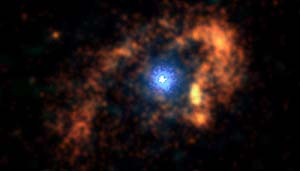
Classified as a Peculiar star, Eta Carinae exhibits a superstar at its center as seen in this image from Chandra X-ray Observatory. Credit: Chandra Science Center and NASA.

New X-ray observations by the Chandra X-ray Observatory show three distinct structures: an outer, horseshoe-shaped ring about 2 light years in diameter, a hot inner core about 3 light-months in diameter, and a hot central source less than 1 light-month in diameter which may contain the superstar that drives the whole show. The outer ring provides evidence of another large explosion that occurred over 1,000 years ago. These three structures around Eta Carinae are thought to represent shock waves produced by matter rushing away from the superstar at supersonic speeds. The temperature of the shock-heated gas ranges from 60 MK in the central regions to 3 MK on the horseshoe-shaped outer structure. "The Chandra image contains some puzzles for existing ideas of how a star can produce such hot and intense X-rays," says Prof. Kris Davidson of the University of Minnesota. Davidson is principal investigator for the Eta Carina observations by the Hubble Space Telescope. "In the most popular theory, X-rays are made by colliding gas streams from two stars so close together that they'd look like a point source to us. But what happens to gas streams that escape to farther distances? The extended hot stuff in the middle of the new image gives demanding new conditions for any theory to meet."

== Amateur X-ray astronomy ==
Collectively, amateur astronomers observe a variety of celestial objects and phenomena sometimes with equipment that they build themselves. The United States Air Force Academy (USAFA) is the home of the US's only undergraduate satellite program, and has and continues to develop the FalconLaunch sounding rockets. In addition to any direct amateur efforts to put X-ray astronomy payloads into space, there are opportunities that allow student-developed experimental payloads to be put on board commercial sounding rockets as a free-of-charge ride.

There are major limitations to amateurs observing and reporting experiments in X-ray astronomy: the cost of building an amateur rocket or balloon to place a detector high enough and the cost of appropriate parts to build a suitable X-ray detector.

== Major questions in X-ray astronomy ==
As X-ray astronomy uses a major spectral probe to peer into the source, it is a valuable tool in efforts to understand many puzzles.

=== Stellar magnetic fields ===
Magnetic fields are ubiquitous among stars, yet we do not understand precisely why, nor have we fully understood the bewildering variety of plasma physical mechanisms that act in stellar environments. Some stars, for example, seem to have magnetic fields, fossil stellar magnetic fields left over from their period of formation, while others seem to generate the field anew frequently.

=== Extrasolar X-ray source astrometry ===
With the initial detection of an extrasolar X-ray source, the first question usually asked is "What is the source?" An extensive search is often made in other wavelengths such as visible or radio for possible coincident objects. Many of the verified X-ray locations still do not have readily discernible sources. X-ray astrometry becomes a serious concern that results in ever greater demands for finer angular resolution and spectral radiance.

There are inherent difficulties in making X-ray/optical, X-ray/radio, and X-ray/X-ray identifications based solely on positional coincidents, especially with handicaps in making identifications, such as the large uncertainties in positional determinants made from balloons and rockets, poor source separation in the crowded region toward the galactic center, source variability, and the multiplicity of source nomenclature.

X‐ray source counterparts to stars can be identified by calculating the angular separation between source centroids and the position of the star. The maximum allowable separation is a compromise between a larger value to identify as many real matches as possible and a smaller value to minimize the probability of spurious matches. "An adopted matching criterion of 40" finds nearly all possible X‐ray source matches while keeping the probability of any spurious matches in the sample to 3%."

=== Solar X-ray astronomy ===
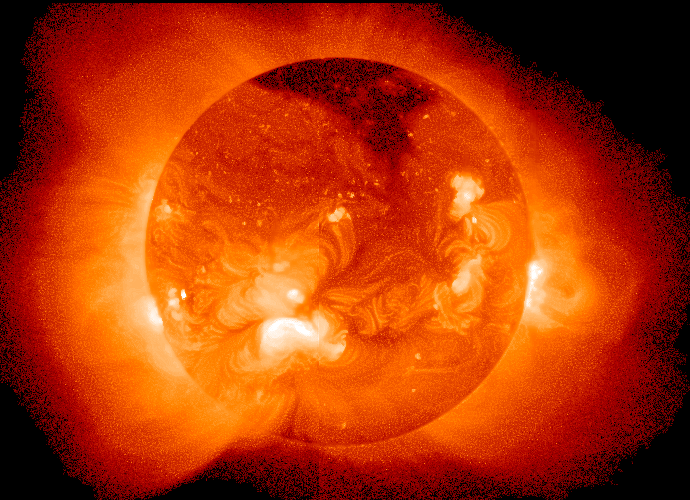
Soft X-ray image of the Sun from the Yohkoh satellite telescope

All of the detected X-ray sources at, around, or near the Sun appear to be associated with processes in the corona, which is its outer atmosphere.

==== Coronal heating problem ====
In the area of solar X-ray astronomy, there is the coronal heating problem. The photosphere of the Sun has an effective temperature of 5,570 K yet its corona has an average temperature of 1–2 million K. However, the hottest regions are 8–20 million K. The high temperature of the corona shows that it is heated by something other than direct heat conduction from the photosphere.

It is thought that the energy necessary to heat the corona is provided by turbulent motion in the convection zone below the photosphere, and two main mechanisms have been proposed to explain coronal heating. The first is wave heating, in which sound, gravitational or magnetohydrodynamic waves are produced by turbulence in the convection zone. These waves travel upward and dissipate in the corona, depositing their energy in the ambient gas in the form of heat. The other is magnetic heating, in which magnetic energy is continuously built up by photospheric motion and released through magnetic reconnection in the form of large solar flares and myriad similar but smaller events—nanoflares.

Currently, it is unclear whether waves are an efficient heating mechanism. All waves except Alfvén waves have been found to dissipate or refract before reaching the corona. In addition, Alfvén waves do not easily dissipate in the corona. Current research focus has therefore shifted towards flare heating mechanisms.

==== Coronal mass ejection ====
A coronal mass ejection (CME) is an ejected plasma consisting primarily of electrons and protons (in addition to small quantities of heavier elements such as helium, oxygen, and iron), plus the entraining coronal closed magnetic field regions. Evolution of these closed magnetic structures in response to various photospheric motions over different time scales (convection, differential rotation, meridional circulation) somehow leads to the CME. Small-scale energetic signatures such as plasma heating (observed as compact soft X-ray brightening) may be indicative of impending CMEs.

The soft X-ray sigmoid (an S-shaped intensity of soft X-rays) is an observational manifestation of the connection between coronal structure and CME production. "Relating the sigmoids at X-ray (and other) wavelengths to magnetic structures and current systems in the solar atmosphere is the key to understanding their relationship to CMEs."

The first detection of a Coronal mass ejection (CME) as such was made on December 1, 1971, by R. Tousey of the US Naval Research Laboratory using OSO 7. Earlier observations of coronal transients or even phenomena observed visually during solar eclipses are now understood as essentially the same thing.

The largest geomagnetic perturbation, resulting presumably from a "prehistoric" CME, coincided with the first-observed solar flare, in 1859. The flare was observed visually by Richard Christopher Carrington and the geomagnetic storm was observed with the recording magnetograph at Kew Gardens. The same instrument recorded a crotchet, an instantaneous perturbation of the Earth's ionosphere by ionizing soft X-rays. This could not easily be understood at the time because it predated the discovery of X-rays (by Roentgen) and the recognition of the ionosphere (by Kennelly and Heaviside).

== Exotic X-ray sources ==
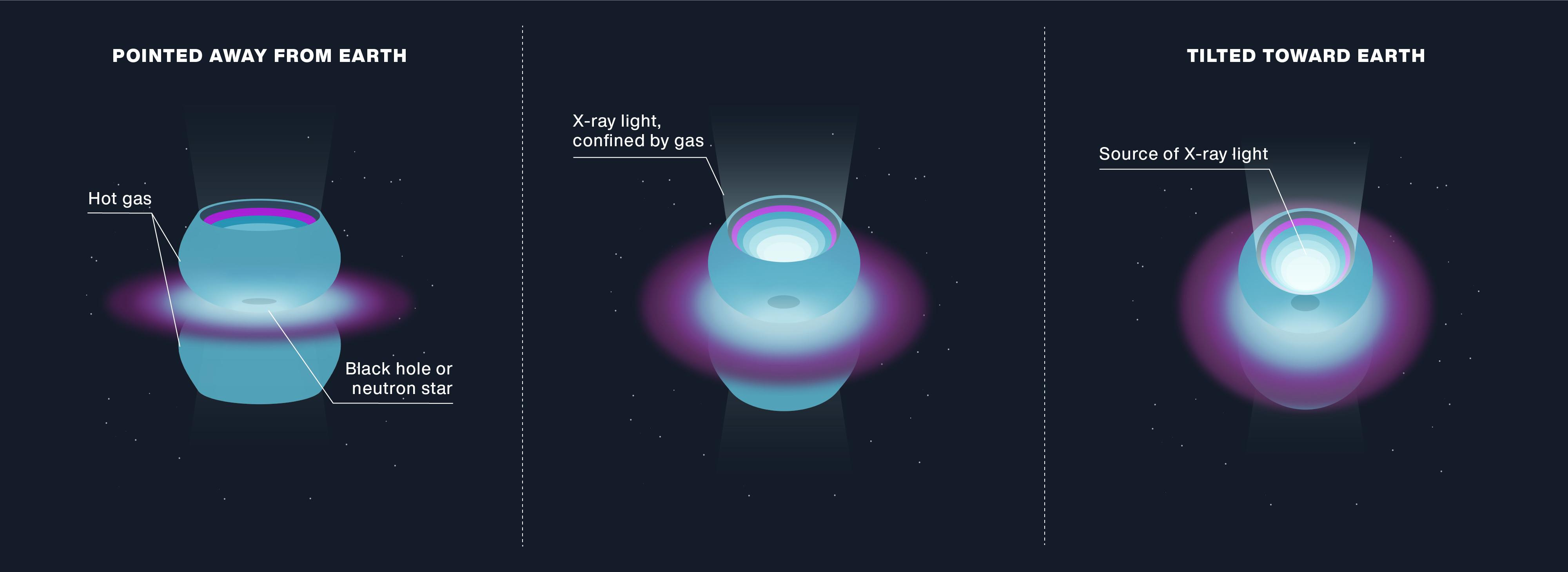
SS 433 - possible ULX ray source

A microquasar is a smaller cousin of a quasar that is a radio emitting X-ray binary, with an often resolvable pair of radio jets. LSI+61°303 is a periodic, radio-emitting binary system that is also the gamma-ray source, CG135+01. Observations are revealing a growing number of recurrent X-ray transients, characterized by short outbursts with very fast rise times (tens of minutes) and typical durations of a few hours that are associated with OB supergiants and hence define a new class of massive X-ray binaries: Supergiant Fast X-ray Transients (SFXTs). Observations made by Chandra indicate the presence of loops and rings in the hot X-ray emitting gas that surrounds Messier 87. A magnetar is a type of neutron star with an extremely powerful magnetic field, the decay of which powers the emission of copious amounts of high-energy electromagnetic radiation, particularly X-rays and gamma rays.

== X-ray dark stars ==
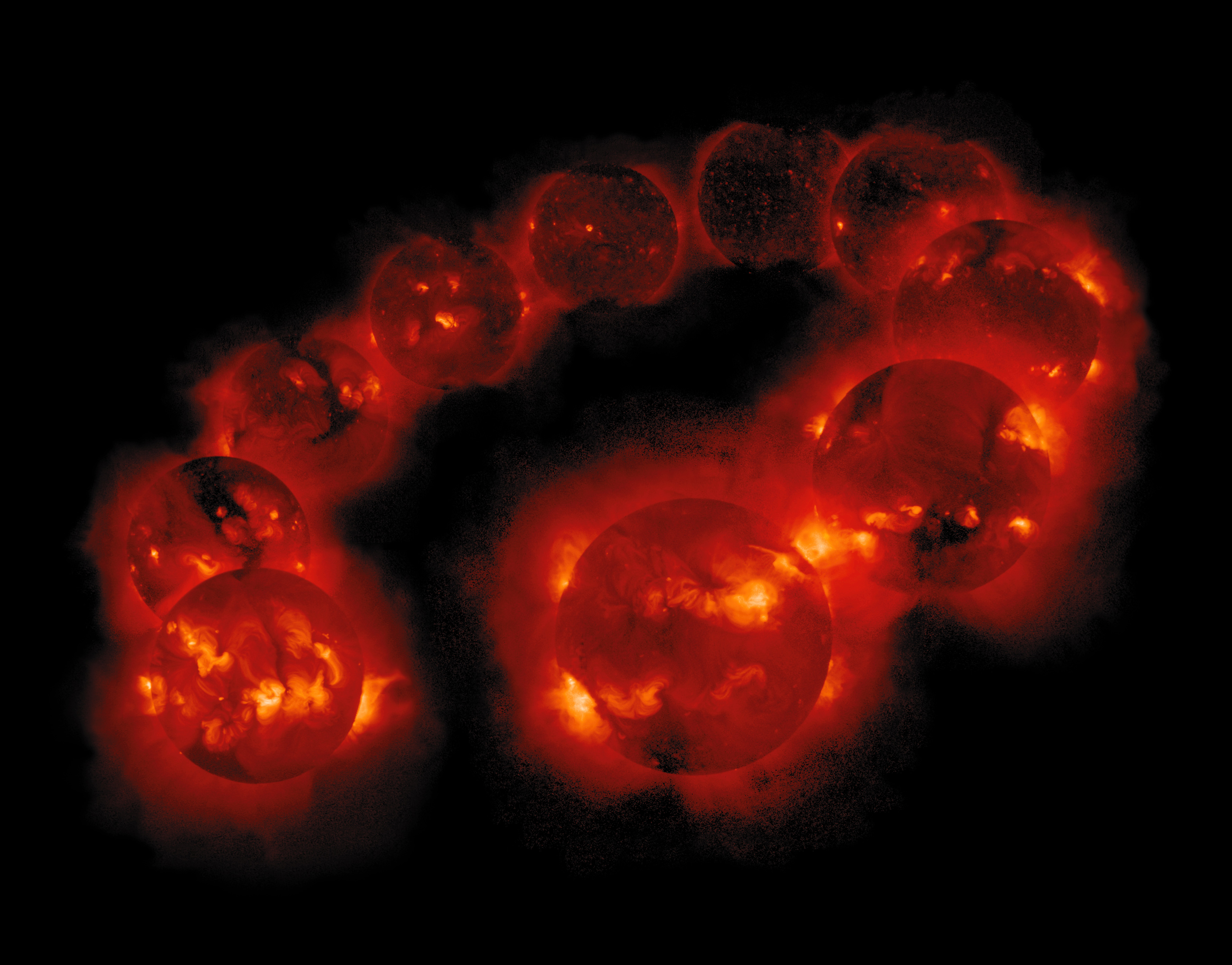
A solar cycle: a montage of ten years' worth of Yohkoh SXT images, demonstrating the variation in solar activity during a sunspot cycle, from after August 30, 1991, at the peak of cycle 22, to September 6, 2001, at the peak of cycle 23. Credit: the Yohkoh mission of Institute of Space and Astronautical Science (ISAS, Japan) and NASA (US).

During the solar cycle, as shown in the sequence of images at right, at times the Sun is almost X-ray dark, almost an X-ray variable. Betelgeuse, on the other hand, appears to be always X-ray dark. Hardly any X-rays are emitted by red giants. There is a rather abrupt onset of X-ray emission around spectral type A7-F0, with a large range of luminosities developing across spectral class F. Altair is spectral type A7V and Vega is A0V. Altair's total X-ray luminosity is at least an order of magnitude larger than the X-ray luminosity for Vega. The outer convection zone of early F stars is expected to be very shallow and absent in A-type dwarfs, yet the acoustic flux from the interior reaches a maximum for late A and early F stars provoking investigations of magnetic activity in A-type stars along three principal lines. Chemically peculiar stars of spectral type Bp or Ap are appreciable magnetic radio sources, most Bp/Ap stars remain undetected, and of those reported early on as producing X-rays only few of them can be identified as probably single stars. X-ray observations offer the possibility to detect (X-ray dark) planets as they eclipse part of the corona of their parent star while in transit. "Such methods are particularly promising for low-mass stars as a Jupiter-like planet could eclipse a rather significant coronal area."

== X-ray dark planets and comets ==
X-ray observations offer the possibility to detect (X-ray dark) planets as they eclipse part of the corona of their parent star while in transit. "Such methods are particularly promising for low-mass stars as a Jupiter-like planet could eclipse a rather significant coronal area."

As X-ray detectors have become more sensitive, they have observed that some planets and other normally X-ray non-luminescent celestial objects under certain conditions emit, fluoresce, or reflect X-rays.

=== Comet Lulin ===
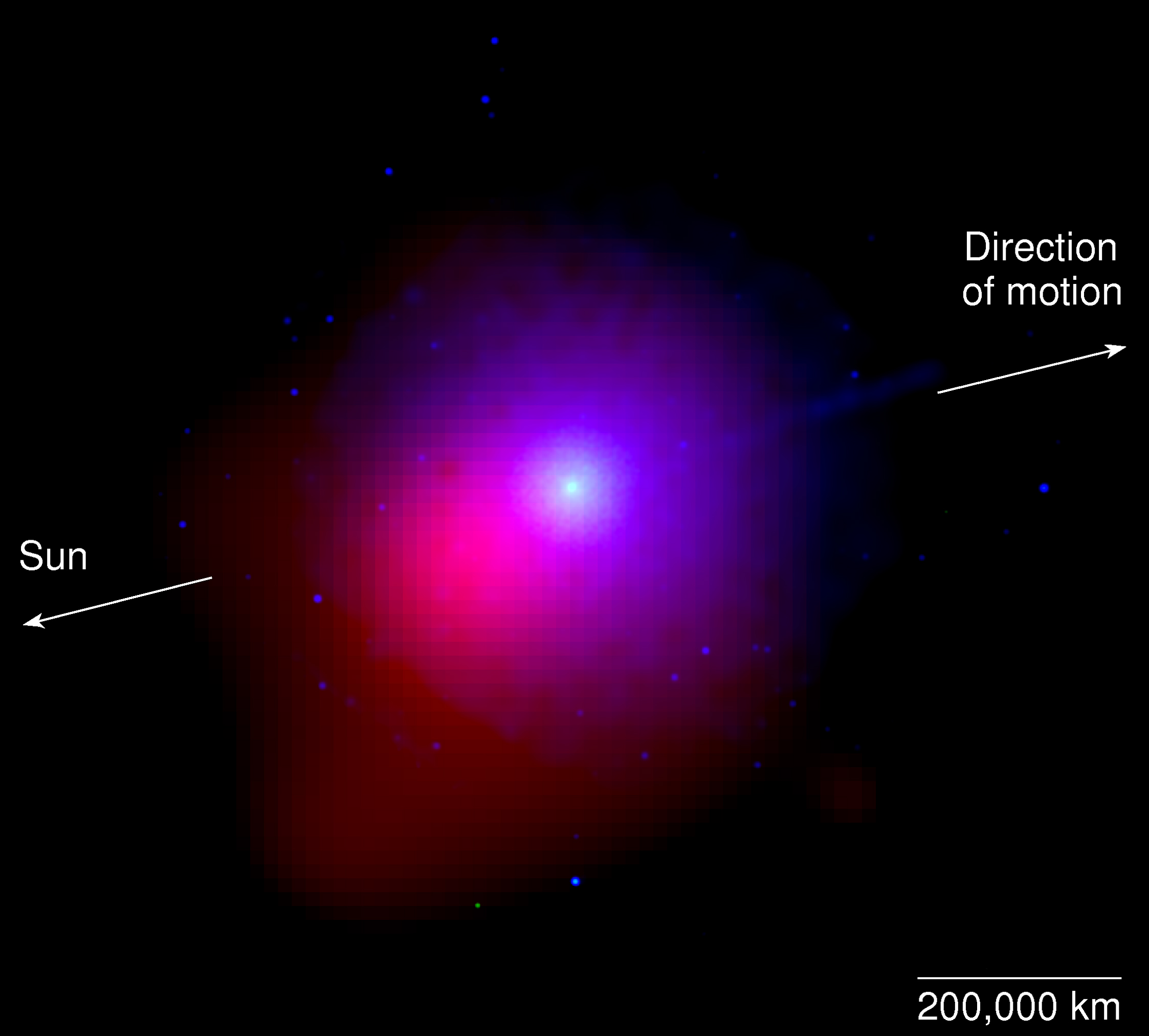
Image of Comet Lulin on 28 January 2009, when the comet was 99.5 million miles from Earth and 115.3 million miles from the Sun, from Swift. Data from Swift's Ultraviolet/Optical Telescope is shown in blue and green, and from its X-Ray Telescope in red.

NASA's Swift Gamma-Ray Burst Mission satellite was monitoring Comet Lulin as it closed to 63 million km of Earth. For the first time, astronomers can see simultaneous UV and X-ray images of a comet. "The solar wind—a fast-moving stream of particles from the sun—interacts with the comet's broader cloud of atoms. This causes the solar wind to light up with X-rays, and that's what Swift's XRT sees", said Stefan Immler, of the Goddard Space Flight Center. This interaction, called charge exchange, results in X-rays from most comets when they pass within about three times Earth's distance from the Sun. Because Lulin is so active, its atomic cloud is especially dense. As a result, the X-ray-emitting region extends far sunward of the comet.

== See also ==
- Balloons for X-ray astronomy
- Crab (unit)
- Gamma-ray astronomy
- History of X-ray astronomy
- IRAS 13224-3809
- List of X-ray space telescopes
- Solar X-ray astronomy
- Ultraviolet astronomy
- X-ray telescope
