= Crabbe =

Crabbe, Crabbé, or Crabb is a surname. Notable people with the surname include:

== Real people ==
- Allan Crabb, Australian football player
- Allen Crabbe, American basketball player
- Annabel Crabb, Australian journalist and author
- Buster Crabbe (1908–1983), American Olympic gold medal swimmer and actor
- Callix Crabbe (born 1983), American baseball player
- Douglas Crabbe, Australian mass murderer
- Earl Frederick Crabb (1899–1986), Canadian-American aviator
- Brigadier General Eyre Crabbe (1852–1905), British Army officer
- Frans Crabbe van Espleghem (1480–1553), Flemish artist
- George Crabbe, British poet and naturalist
- Habakkuk Crabb, English minister
- Henry A. Crabb, American judge
- Joey Crabb, American ice hockey player
- John Crabbe, Flemish merchant, pirate and soldier
- John Crabbe (footballer), English soccer player
- Kelly C. Crabb, American lawyer and author
- Jason Crabb (born 1977), American musician
- Jeremiah Crabb (1760–1800), American Revolutionary War general
- Lionel Crabb, Royal Navy frogman
- Roy Crabb (1890–1940), American baseball player
- Samuel Azu Crabbe (1918–2005), Ghanaian judge
- Stephen Crabb (born 1973), British politician
- Steve Crabb, Australian politician
- Steve Crabb (athlete), British middle-distance runner
- V. C. R. A. C. Crabbe, Ghanaian jurist

== Fictional characters ==
- Franklin Crabbe, character in the novel Crabbe by William E. Bell
- Henry Crabbe, lead character in the British TV series Pie in the Sky
- Lee Crabb, antagonist in the Dinotopia book series
- Nicholas Crabbe, character in an eponymous novel by Frederick Rolfe
- Vincent Crabbe, character in the Harry Potter series

== See also ==
- Crabb, Texas, unincorporated community in Fort Bend County, Texas, United States
- Jeroen Krabbé, Dutch actor
- Roger Crab (1621–1680), English soldier, haberdasher, herbal doctor and writer
