= Frans Crabbe van Espleghem =

Flemish artist (c.1480–1553)

Frans Crabbe van Espleghem (c. 1480 – 1553) was a Flemish artist.

Frans Crabbe began exploring printmaking after Albrecht Dürer's visit to the Habsburg Netherlands in 1521. Crabbe was known for doing engravings, etchings and woodcuts.

== Master of the Crayfish ==
Early artists did not sign their names or identify themselves as the maker of the work in any way. At some point artists began adding discrete logos, monograms, initials, etc. to their works but in a number of cases the actual artist has not been identified. Where the artist has not been identified, all works done with the particular logo are assumed to have been done by the same artist and are referred to by the identifying marks e.g.: The Master E.S or Master I.B with the Bird.

Crabbe was initially known as "Master of the Crayfish". This was based on a crayfish type logo in his prints.

As per Hind:

Closely dependent on the style of Quentin Matsys, and influenced in some degree by Lucas van Leyden (note the long forms in the Execution of the Baptist) stands the engraver who uses a Crayfish as his signature. He has been identified with a certain Frans Crabbe (or Crabeth) of Mechlin, but the hypothesis is a mere conjecture. He varies the lineal system of his predecessors by a very liberal use of dotted work (e.g. Death of Lucretia, B. 23), and also combines with his engraving a delicately etched line. Some of his plates (e.g. the Execution of John the Baptist, P. 28) seem entirely composed of bitten work, and the influence of Dirick Vellert’s technique is unmistakable.

Friedlander positively identified the "Master of the Crayfish" as being Frans Crabbe in 1921.

== Biblio ==
- Adam Bartsch. Le Peintre Graveur (Vienna: J. V. Degen, 1803–1821): vol. VII, pp. 527–534; vol. VIII, pp. 5.
- Adam Bartsch. et al. The Illustrated Bartsch (New York: Abaris Books, 1978 - ongoing 2001): vol. 13, pp. 279–298; vol. 14, pp. 173
- Popham, A. E. Engravings and Etchings of Frans Crabbe van Espleghem The Print Collector’s Quarterly 1935 Apr Vol 22, No. 2, p93 -115
- Popham, A. E. Catalogue of Engravings and Etchings of Frans Crabbe The Print Collector’s Quarterly 1935 July Vol 22, No. 3, p195 - 211
- Hind, A. M. A Short History of Engraving & Etching; London; Archibald Constable & Co 1908 p. 90
- Bassens, M. Frans Crabbe van Espleghem (ca. 1480–1553). New research on the life and works of the Master with the Crab, with special attention for his graphic work (unpublished dissertation, KU Leuven) 2016.
