= Krab (surname) =

Krab is a surname. Notable people with the surname include:

- Jørn Krab (born 1945), Danish rower
- Preben Krab (born 1952), Danish rower, brother of Jørn. Fictional Characters :
- Eugene Krabs
