= Crab, Virginia =

Unincorporated community in Virginia, United States

Coordinates: 37°15′55″N 76°29′28″W

Crab is an unincorporated community in Gloucester County, in the U. S. state of Virginia.
