= UX Arietis =

Trinary star system in the constellation Aries

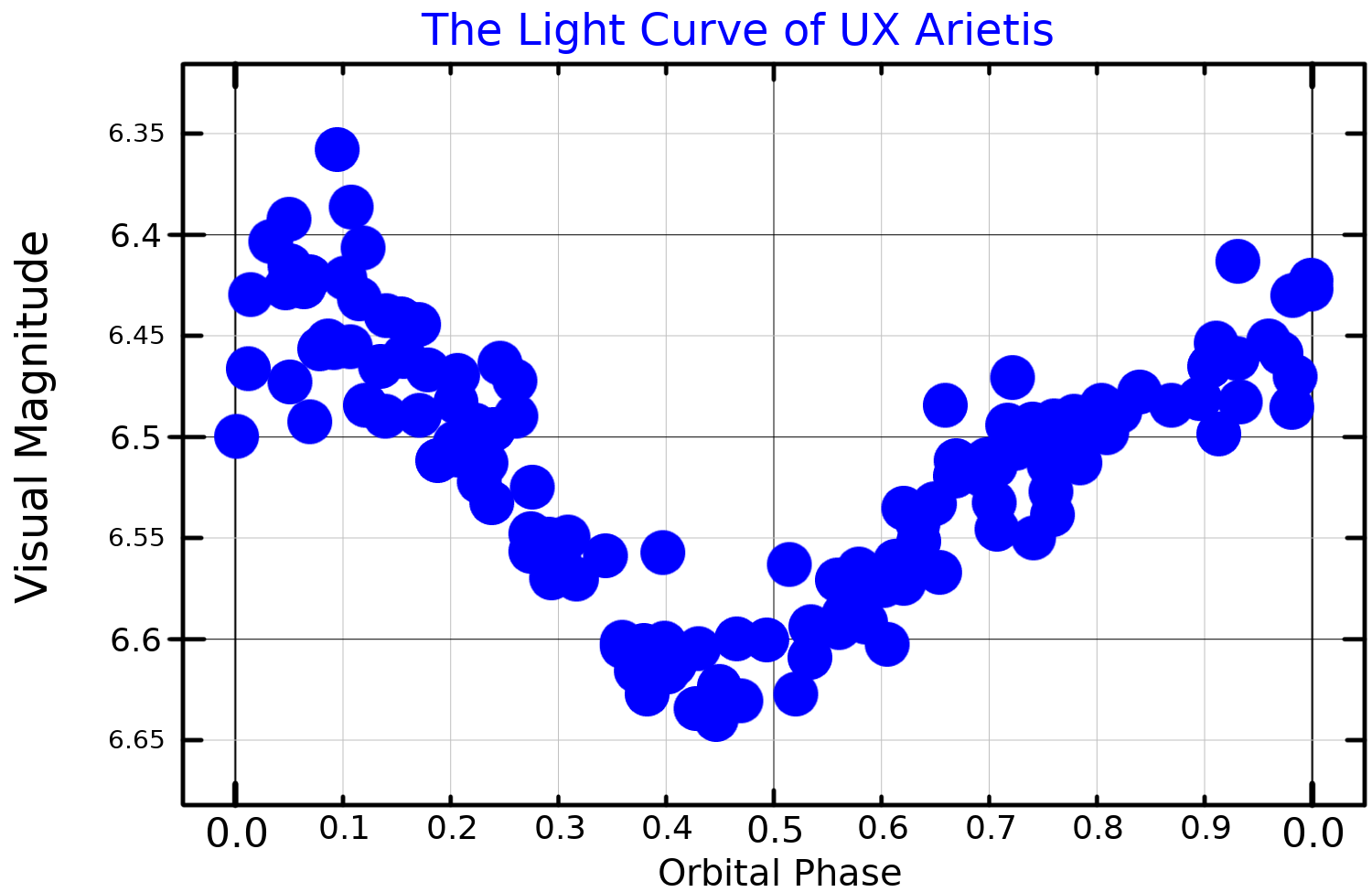
- A visual band light curve for UX Arietis, adapted from Ulvås and Henry (2003)

Observation data Epoch J2000 Equinox ICRS
- Constellation: Aries
- Right ascension: 03^{h} 26^{m} 35.37568^{s}
- Declination: +28° 42′ 54.2264″
- Apparent magnitude (V): 6.35 - 6.71

Characteristics
- Spectral type: G5IV
- U−B color index: 0.43
- B−V color index: 0.90
- Variable type: RS CVn

Astrometry
Radial velocity (R_{v})	+26.53 km/s
Proper motion (μ)	RA: +46.794 mas/yr Dec.: −102.876 mas/yr
Parallax (π)	19.7836±0.1264 mas
Distance	165 ± 1 ly (50.5 ± 0.3 pc)
Absolute magnitude (M_{V})	2.91

Orbit
Primary	Aa
Name	Ab
Period (P)	6.437888±0.000007 d
Semi-major axis (a)	1.750±0.01 mas
Eccentricity (e)	0 (fixed)
Inclination (i)	125.0±0.5°
Longitude of the node (Ω)	113.4±0.4°
Periastron epoch (T)	2456238.134 ± 0.002 HJD
Argument of periastron (ω) (secondary)	90 (fixed)°

Orbit
Primary	A
Name	B
Period (P)	111.02 yr
Semi-major axis (a)	648.0±0.8 mas
Eccentricity (e)	0.77±0.01
Inclination (i)	93.3±0.6°
Longitude of the node (Ω)	58.9±0.5°
Periastron epoch (T)	2451664.9±34.3 HJD
Argument of periastron (ω) (secondary)	274.9±0.8°

Details

UX Ari Aa
Mass	1.30±0.06 M_{☉}
Radius	5.6±0.1 R_{☉}
Luminosity	9.3±0.7 L_{☉}
Surface gravity (log g)	3.06±0.04 cgs
Temperature	4,560±100 K
Rotation	6.44 d

UX Ari Ab
Mass	1.14±0.06 M_{☉}
Radius	1.6±0.2 R_{☉}
Luminosity	2.34±0.28 L_{☉}
Surface gravity (log g)	4.09±0.16 cgs
Temperature	5,670±100 K

UX Ari B
Mass	0.75 M_{☉}
Radius	0.8±0.1 R_{☉}
Luminosity	0.38±0.08 L_{☉}
Surface gravity (log g)	4.51±0.13 cgs
Temperature	4,930±100 K

Other designations
- BD+28°532, CCDM 03266+2843, HD 21242, HIP 16042, SAO 75927

Database references
SIMBAD	data
ARICNS	data

UX Arietis is a triple star system located in the northern zodiacal constellation of Aries. Based upon parallax measurements from the Gaia satellite, it is roughly 165 light years away. The star varies in brightness from magnitude 6.35 to 6.71, meaning it may be intermittently visible to the unaided eye under ideal dark-sky conditions.

In 1972, Robert E. Montle and Douglas S. Hall discovered that the star's brightness varies. It was given its variable star designation in 1973. The primary, component Aa, is the variable star, of the RS CVn type. The variability of the star is believed due to a combination of cool star spots and warm flares, set against the baseline quiescent temperature of the stellar atmosphere. The variability appears to be cyclical with a period of 8−9 years.

A more distant companion, component C, shares a common proper motion and is at the same distance. It is another cool dwarf star with an estimated spectral class of K2. Any orbit is estimated to require over 100,000 years.
