= Crab Island =

Crab Island may refer to:

== United States ==
- Crab Island, a shoal near Destin, Florida
- Crab Island (Lake Champlain), New York
- Crab Island, one of the San Juan Islands, Washington
- Crab Island (West Virginia), on the Ohio River
- Vieques, Puerto Rico, formerly known as Crab Island

== Elsewhere ==
- Crab Island (Queensland), Australia, in the western Torres Strait
- Crab Island, Guyana, at the mouth of the Berbice River
- Crab Island, Malaysia (Pulau Ketam)
- Dova Haw or Crab Island, Cumbria, England

== See also ==
- Crab Cay, Colombia, in the Caribbean Sea
- Crab Key, a fictional Caribbean island in the James Bond novel Dr. No and the film adaptation
