= Russian submarine Krab =

Russian submarine Krab may refer to one of the following submarines:

- Russian submarine Krab (1912), a unique submarine of the Russian Imperial Navy; served during World War I; captured by the Germans and handed over to British forces; scuttled by British at Sevastopol in 1919; wreck raised in 1935 and scrapped
- Russian submarine K-276 Krab, a Sierra I-class nuclear-powered submarine launched for the Soviet Navy in 1986; later renamed B-276 Kostroma; transferred to the Russian Navy upon its creation
