= Crab (unit) =

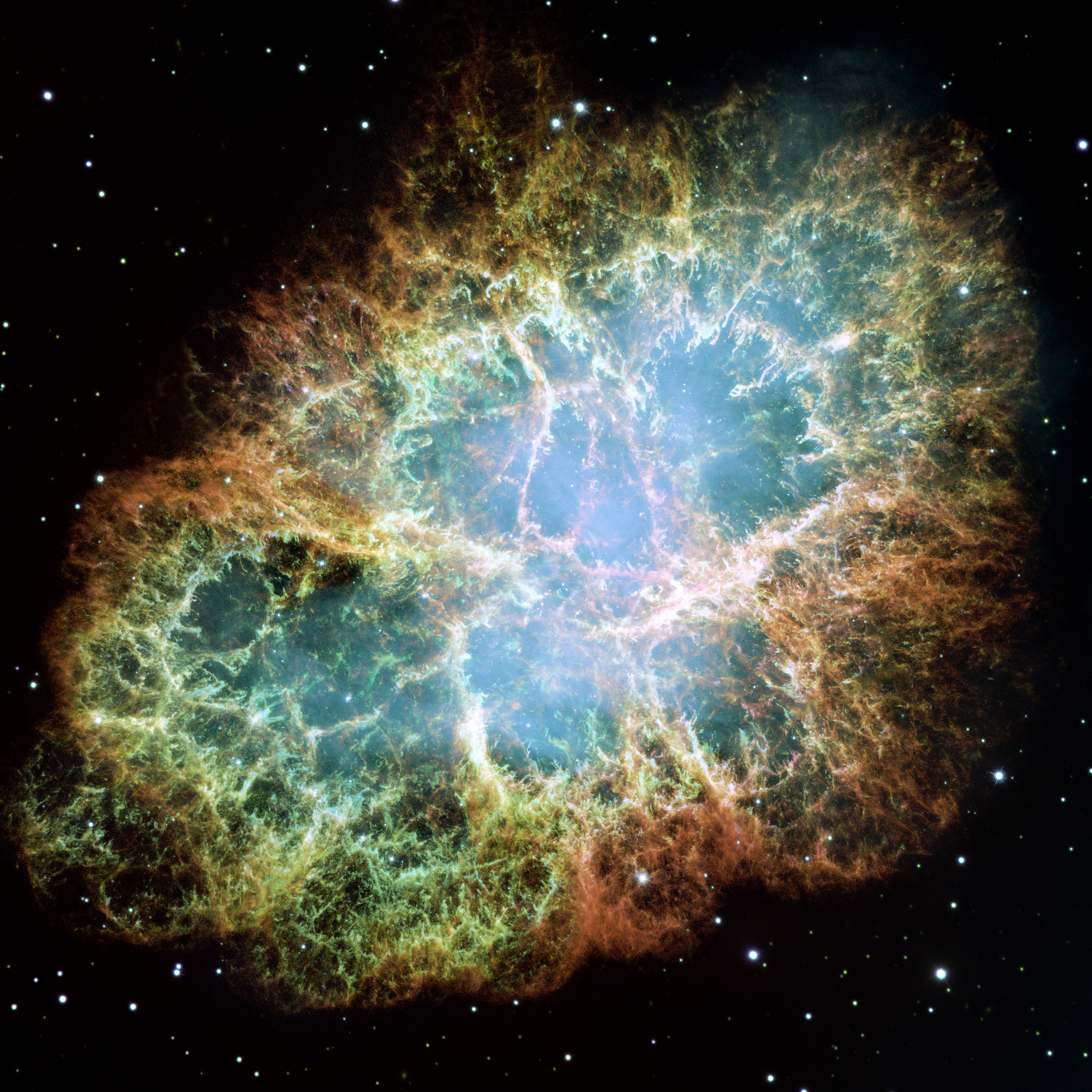
The Crab unit is defined relative to the Crab Nebula

A Crab is a standard astrophotometrical unit for measurement of the intensity of astrophysical X-ray sources. One Crab is defined as the intensity of the Crab Nebula at the corresponding X-ray photon energy.

The Crab Nebula, and the Crab Pulsar within it, is an intense space X-ray source. It is used as a standard candle in the calibration procedure of X-ray instruments in space. However, because of the Crab Nebula's variable intensity at different X-ray energies, conversion of the Crab to another units depends on the X-ray energy range of interest.

In the photon energy range from 2 to 10 keV, 1 Crab equals 2.4 · 10^{−8} erg cm^{−2} s^{−1} = 15 keV cm^{−2} s^{−1} = 2.4 · 10^{−11} W m^{−2}. For energies greater than ~30 keV, the Crab Nebula becomes unsuitable for calibration purposes, as its flux can no longer be characterized by a single coherent model.

The unit mCrab, or milliCrab, is sometimes used instead of the Crab.
