= Kepler-1513 =

Main-sequence star in the constellation Lyra

Observation data Epoch J2000 Equinox ICRS
- Constellation: Lyra
- Right ascension: 19^{h} 19^{m} 09.99418^{s}
- Declination: +39° 17′ 06.9287″
- Apparent magnitude (V): 12.888±0.100 (Kepler band)

Characteristics
- Evolutionary stage: Main sequence
- Spectral type: K0V or late G
- Apparent magnitude (G): 12.946±0.003
- Apparent magnitude (J): 11.758±0.027
- Apparent magnitude (H): 11.397±0.030
- Apparent magnitude (K): 11.309±0.020

Astrometry
Radial velocity (R_{v})	−0.42±1.41 km/s
Proper motion (μ)	RA: 20.439 mas/yr Dec.: 1.745 mas/yr
Parallax (π)	2.8446±0.0134 mas
Distance	1,147 ± 5 ly (352 ± 2 pc)

Details
Mass	0.943±0.037 M_{☉}
Radius	0.950+0.077 −0.055 R_{☉}
Luminosity (bolometric)	0.743+0.148 −0.100 L_{☉}
Surface gravity (log g)	4.46±0.10 cgs
Temperature	5491±100 K
Metallicity	0.17±0.06 [M/H]
Age	7.0+4.0 −4.2 Gyr

Other designations
- Kepler-1513, KOI-3678, KIC 4150804, TIC 394177315, 2MASS J19190999+3917070

Database references
SIMBAD	data
Exoplanet Archive	data

Kepler-1513 is a main-sequence star about 1,150 light-years (350 parsecs) away in the constellation Lyra. It has a late-G or early-K spectral type, and it hosts at least one, and likely two, exoplanets.

== Planetary system ==
Kepler-1513b (KOI-3678.01) was confirmed in 2016 as part of a study statistically validating hundreds of Kepler planets. In November 2022, an exomoon candidate was reported around Kepler-1513b based on transit-timing variations (TTVs). Unlike previous giant exomoon candidates in the Kepler-1625 and Kepler-1708 systems, this exomoon would have been terrestrial-mass, ranging from 0.76 Lunar masses to 0.34 Earth masses depending on the planet's mass and the moon's orbital period.

In October 2023, a follow-up study by the same team of astronomers using additional observations found that the observed TTVs cannot be explained by an exomoon, but can be explained by a second, outer planet, Kepler-1513c, with a mass comparable to Saturn.

The Kepler-1513 planetary system
Companion (in order from star)	Mass	Semimajor axis (AU)	Orbital period (days)	Eccentricity	Inclination (°)	Radius
b	0.152+0.104 −0.061 M_{J}	0.53+0.04 −0.03	160.8842+0.0011 −0.0028	0.306+0.093 −0.097	—	8.05+0.58 −0.40 R_{🜨}
c	0.266+0.098 −0.063 M_{J}	1.71	841.4+8.1 −5.3	0.125+0.018 −0.019	—	—

== See also ==
- Kepler-90g
