= Systemizing =

Systemizing, systemization or systematization (alternatively spelt systemising, systemisation and systematisation respectively) may refer to:

- Systemizing quotient
- Romanian systematization programme

== See also ==
- System
- Systemic
- Systemics
- Systematic
- Systematics (disambiguation)
