= Marketing information system =

Management information system supporting decision making

A marketing information system (MkIS) is a management information system (MIS) designed to support marketing decision making. Jobber (2007) defines it as a "system in which marketing data is formally gathered, stored, analysed and distributed to managers in accordance with their informational needs on a regular basis." In addition, the online business dictionary defines Marketing Information System (MkIS) as "a system that analyzes and assesses marketing information, gathered continuously from sources inside and outside an organization or a store." Furthermore, "an overall Marketing Information System can be defined as a set structure of procedures and methods for the regular, planned collection, analysis and presentation of information for use in making marketing decisions." (Kotler, et al., 2006)

MkIS plays an increasingly important role in marketing decisions, particularly in positioning and launching products in new markets.

== Overview ==
Reid and Bojanic(2010) claimed that, " The term market research informs relatively narrowly than Marketing Information System(MkIS) which is altered from the term management information systemization. Market research indicates that information is collected for a specific reason or project; the major objective is a one-time use. "

"A marketing information system, which continuously collects the initial, routine and systematic data, is not only used for one particular topic but is designed for monitoring the degree of marketing success to ensure the achievable of the operation as well."

== Importance ==
As the concepts are clear MkIS aid in the most establishments for taking early and post decisions, analysing the performance of the target and achievements based on availability of required structured data etc. Developing an MkIS system is becoming extremely important as the strength of economies rely on services and to better understand the specific needs of customers. Kotler, et al. (2006) defined it more broadly as "people, equipment, and procedures to gather, sort, analyze, evaluate, and distribute needed, timely, and accurate information to marketing decision makers."

Insofar as an economy focuses on services, marketing is important to "monitor the marketing environment for changes in buyer behavior competition, technology, economic conditions, and government policies." In this sense, the role of marketing is becoming pivotal for an organization to "adapt to changes in the market environment." (Harmon, 2003)

As an economy relies on the acquisition of knowledge, MkIS systems are necessary to be able to define and differentiate the value proposition that one organization provides with respect to another, as well as to define their competitive advantage. (Harmon, 2003)

The main benefit of MkIS systems is to integrate market-monitoring systems with strategy development and the strategic implementation of policies and processes that help capture and act on customer management applications with marketing decision support systems. This area constitute Marketing intelligence that supports the analysis and market based activities that support customer relations and customer service with real time information with real time applications that support market based approaches.

=== Relevance of MkIS ===
Shajahan and arya(2004) stated that, "Demands for the MkIS can be expressed by three crucial developments. Firstly, when companies expand and diversify into new markets, both the companies and customer's point of view are needed to be handled by the marketing managers. Therefore, there would be greater need for marketing information. Secondly, when consumers obtain an increment in the level of their income, it causes a tendency for them to be more discriminating during the purchasing procedure. A full awareness of the points that drive a consumer prefer a brand and the points that distinguished his brand from that of the rivals should be obtained by the marketers. This awareness is possible only with the help of a well- designed effective MkIS. Thirdly, the development of the markets and the movement from price to non-price grounds of competition lead to an increase in the importance of adoption and implementation by the competitors and finding the response of the consumers towards them. Analyzing the needs for MkIS from a third person's angle, three more factors come to the forefront viz., the information explosion, increasing complexity in decision making and the technological developments. "

=== Marketing Research (MR) and MkIS ===
In addition, "Great demand of information gathering for marketing decisions results in the need of attention by themselves. Though marketing research information can be generated by studies, which are normally conducted in the market place whereas marketing information systems are designed to gather, integrate, process and distribute marketing information comprehensively from all sources, including that from marketing research. The contrasting characteristics of MkIS and MR are presented in Table 5.1 as shown below:

Table 5.1 Showing contrasting characteristic of MR and MkIS

Marketing Research	Marketing Information System
1.Emphasis is on handling external information	1.It handles both internal and external data.
2.It is concerned with solving problems.	2. It is concerned with preventing as well as solving problems.
3.It operates in a fragmented fashion – on a project-to-project basis.	3.It operates continuously as a system.
4.It tends to focus on past information.	4.It tends to be future oriented.
5.It is a source of input for marketing information system.	5.It includes other subsystems besides marketing research.

The business function of marketing is concerned more with the planning, promotion and sale of products in existing markets and the development of new products and new markets. Thus marketing performs a vital function in the operation of a business enterprise. Business firms who turned to computers have been able to perform vital marketing function effectively for organizations' growth in the face of global competition."

== Main Structure ==
According to Robert Jamon (2003), MkIS systems are composed on four components: (1) user interfaces, (2) application software, (3) databases, and (4) system support. The following is a description of each one of these components:

1. User interfaces. The essential element of the MAkINAS is the managers who will use the system and the interface they need to effectively analyze and use marketing information. The design of the system will depend on what type of decision managers need to make.

2. Application software. These are the programs that marketing decision makers, use to collect, analyze, and manage data for the purpose of developing the information necessary for marketing decisions.

3. Database marketing. A marketing database is a system in which marketing data files are organized and stored.

4. System support. This component consists of system managers who manage and maintain the system assets including software and hardware network, monitor its activities and ensure compliance with organizational policies.

Along with these components, MkIS systems include Marketing Decision Support Systems (MDSS), which in turn rely on simple systems such as Microsoft Excel, SPSS, and on-line analytical tools that help collect data. Data compiled for analysis is stored and processed from a data warehouse, which is simply a data repository system that helps store and further process data collected internally and externally. (Harmon, 2003)

=== Databases ===
From Pride and Ferrell (2010), "Internal database is a part of the most marketing information systems. In addition, it's relatively convenient for access and retrieve of information. A databases allow marketers to tap into an abundance of information useful in making marketing decisions: internal sales reports, newspaper articles, company news releases, government economic reports, bibliographies, and more, often accessed through a computer system."

==== Internal Data ====
In with Birn(2004), " internal data is a part of the data that is needed to be collect and handled by the marketing information system. Further more, managers regard this as a command to make effective operation.But getting the information that is really needed from a marketing information system depends on what the information is and how it is used. The following internal operating data are essential:

- Sales data, presented in a graphic format, can provide regular sales trend information and highlight whether certain customer types need to be targeted or focused.
- Price information by product line, compare with competitors, can monitor market trends; analyzed by customer type, it can check price trends in customer groups.
- Stock level data and trends in key accounts or distributors, focusing on whether different outlets need support, provide market share information.
- Market support information, coordinating the effects of marketing promotions, through advertising, direct marketing, trade incentives, consumer competitions and so on, helps to determine whether decisions are being made effectively.
- Competitive information, reviewing competitors' promotions and communications to see if the company is doing it better or worse than competitors, can improve market targeting."

=== Environmental scanning ===
Sandhusen (2000) defined that, environmental scanning is a display of the nature of MkIS processed. " It gives assistance for the marketers to develop the strategies, policies, plans and to make programs and budgets through dealing with the ongoing information on trends."

=== Kotler's Model ===
According to Philip Kotler, the four components that comprise the MkIS system are Internal Reports (Records) System, Marketing Research System, Marketing Intelligence System, and Marketing Decision Support System

1.Internal Reports System: It records various data from different department of a company, which is regarded as a major source of information.

2.Marketing Intelligence System: It is a main source used by managers for gaining daily information of the external environment, hence assists the managers to react to the rapidly changing environment.

3.Marketing Research System: It is used to collect primary and secondary data, and displays the results in forms of reports.

4.Marketing Decision Support System: Compared to the supply of the data by the three previous systems, it focuses more on processing the data.

== Advantages, Features, Limitations & Possible Risks ==
=== Advantages ===
Bhasin stated that,"With an increasingly competitive and expanding market, the amount of information needed daily by an organization is profound. So they have to establish a Marketing Information system. There are several advantages of Marketing information systems

- Organized Data collection – MkIS can help the managers to organize loads of data collected from the market, thus results in an increment in the productivity.
- A broad perspective – With a proper MkIS in place, the organization can be tracked which can be used to analyze independent processes. This helps in establishing a broader perspective which helps us know which steps can be taken to facilitate improvement.
- Storage of Important Data – The storage of important data is essential in execution and thus proves again that MkIS is not important only for information but also for execution.
- Avoidance of Crisis – The best way to analyze a stock (share market) is to see its past performance. Top websites like moneycontrol thrive on MkIS. Similarly MkIS helps you keep tracks of margins and profits. With an amazing information system established, an organizations direction can be analysed and probably crises averted before they place.
- Co-ordination – Consumer durables and FMCG companies have huge number of processes which needs to be co-ordinated. These companies depend completely on MkIS for the proper running of the organization.
- Analysis and Planning – MkIS plays a crucial role in the planning process, considering the planning procedure requires information. For planning, the first thing which is needed is the organizations capabilities, then the business environment and finallycompetitor analysis. In a proper MkIS, all these are present by default and are continuously updated. Therefore, MkIS is very important for planning and analysis.
- Control – Just like MkIS can help in a crisis, in normal times it provides control as you have information of the various processes going on and what is happening across the company."

=== Possible risks ===
"Nevertheless, the collection of marketing information should obey a high-frequent manner due to the rapid change in the external market." The possible risks the business may face if they disobey the manner according to Bhasin are:

- Opportunities may be missed.
- There may be a lack of awareness of environmental changes and competitors' actions.
- Data collection may be difficult to analyze over several time periods.
- Marketing plans and decisions may not be properly reviewed.
- Data collection may be disjointed.
- Previous studies may not be stored in an easy-to-use format.
- Time lags may result if a new study is required.
- Actions may be reactionary rather than anticipatory.

Maintenance, complexity and setting up a MkIS are one of the major hindrances to Marketing information systems. Furthermore, wrong information being fed in MkIS can become cumbersome and appropriate filters need to be established.

=== Limitations ===
Kotler and Philip have said that "both primary and secondary researches offer loads of the data and information needed for the marketers, whereas the secondary data sources are relatively superior in quick provision of data at lower cost. Simultaneously, a firm cannot find all the data required by itself, but sometimes can be done with the help of secondary research. However, researchers must assess those data collected from both primary and secondary data sources to enable the accuracy, updates and fairness. Each primary data collection method – observational, survey, and experimental – has its own advantages and disadvantages. Similarly, each of the various research contact methods – mail, telephone, personal interview, and online – also has its own advantages and drawbacks."

== Rural Marketing Information System (RuMIS) ==
A RuMIS is necessary not only for corporate organizations engaged in marketing of agricultural goods and manufactured goods intended for sales in rural areas. RuMIS is also essential for agriculturists and farmers who must make complex marketing and operational decisions.
