= Tidally detached exomoon =

Planet that was formerly a moon of another planet

Tidally detached exomoons, also known as orphaned exomoons or ploonets, are hypothetical exoplanets that were formerly exomoons of another planet, before being ejected from their orbits around their parent planets by tidal forces during planetary migration, and becoming planets in their own right. As of 2026, no tidally detached moons have yet been definitively detected, but they are believed to be likely to exist around other stars, and potentially detectable by photometric methods. Researchers at Columbia University have suggested that a disrupting detached exomoon may be causing the unusual fluctuations in brightness exhibited by Tabby's Star.

== History ==
The term ploonet, a blend of the words planet and moon, was first used in a 2019 paper in the Monthly Notices of the Royal Astronomical Society. It received attention from mainstream media sources, with CNET calling it "charmingly goofy".

== See also ==
- Subsatellite – Satellite that orbits a natural satellite
- Rogue planet – Planet not gravitationally bound to a star
- Rogue black hole – Interstellar or intergalactic object
- Exoplanet – Planet outside of the Solar System
- Exomoon – Moon beyond the Solar System
- Kozai mechanism – Phenomenon affecting the orbit of a binary system
- Poynting–Robertson effect – Process whereby solar radiation causes orbiting dust grains to lose angular momentum
