= Sistema (disambiguation) =

Sistema is a Russian conglomerate company.

Sistema may also refer to:

- Sistema 700, Brazilian personal professional microcomputer
- Sistema Plastics, a New Zealand plastic container company
- El Sistema, a music education programme founded in Venezuela

== See also ==
- Systema (disambiguation)
- System (disambiguation)
