= Kepler-1625 =

Star with exoplanet

Observation data Epoch J2000.0 Equinox ICRS
- Constellation: Cygnus
- Right ascension: 19^{h} 41^{m} 43.04008^{s}
- Declination: +39° 53′ 11.4990″
- Apparent magnitude (V): 16.1

Characteristics
- Evolutionary stage: subgiant
- Spectral type: G
- Apparent magnitude (K): 13.916

Astrometry
Proper motion (μ)	RA: −2.088(32) mas/yr Dec.: −4.804(32) mas/yr
Parallax (π)	0.4548±0.0289 mas
Distance	7,200 ± 500 ly (2,200 ± 100 pc)

Details
Mass	1.04±0.08 M_{☉}
Radius	1.73±0.24 R_{☉}
Luminosity (bolometric)	2.57±0.68 L_{☉}
Surface gravity (log g)	3.99±0.10 cgs
Temperature	5,563±86 K
Metallicity [Fe/H]	0.06±0.13 dex
Age	8.7±2.1 Gyr

Other designations
- Kepler-1625, KOI-5084, KIC 4760478, 2MASS J19414304+3953115

Database references
SIMBAD	data

Kepler-1625 is a 14th-magnitude solar-mass star located in the constellation of Cygnus approximately 7,200 light-years (2,200 parsecs) away. Its mass is within 5% of that of the Sun, but its radius is approximately 70% larger reflecting its more evolved state. A candidate gas giant exoplanet was detected by the Kepler Mission around the star in 2015, which was later validated as a real planet to >99% confidence in 2016. In 2018, the Hunt for Exomoons with Kepler project reported evidence for a Neptune-sized exomoon around this planet, based on observations from NASA's Kepler mission and the Hubble Space Telescope. Subsequently, the evidence for and reality of this exomoon candidate has been subject to debate.

== Stellar characteristics ==
Kepler-1625 is an approximately solar-mass star and yet is 1.7 times larger in diameter. Its effective temperature is around 5,550 K, slightly lower than that of the Sun. These parameters suggest that Kepler-1625 may be a yellow subgiant nearing the end of its life, with an age of approximately 8.7 billion years. The star has been observed to be photometrically quiet, with periodic variability below 0.02%. Kepler-1625 is located approximately 7,200 light-years away in the constellation Cygnus.

== Planetary system ==
The Kepler-1625 planetary system
Companion (in order from star)	Mass	Semimajor axis (AU)	Orbital period (days)	Eccentricity	Inclination (°)	Radius
b	≤11.6 M_{J}	0.98±0.14	287.3727±0.0022	—	89.97±0.02	11.4±1.6 R_{🜨}

The star is known to have one validated planet. Designated Kepler-1625b, it is a Jovian-sized planet orbiting its star every 287.3 Earth days. No other candidate transiting planets have been found around the star.

=== Potential exomoon ===
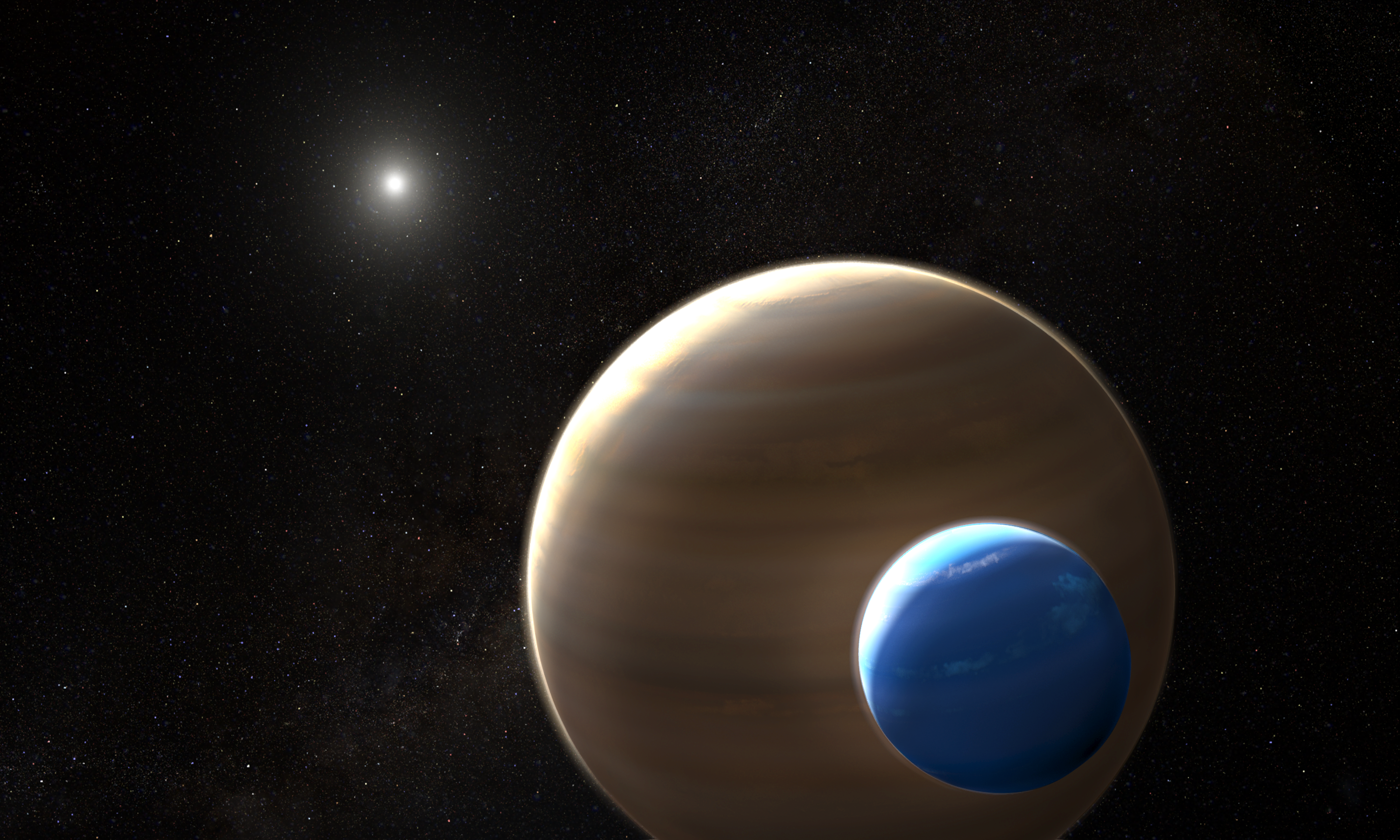
Artist's impression of the exoplanet Kepler-1625b and its candidate exomoon Kepler-1625b I.

The Kepler Mission recorded three planetary transits of Kepler-1625b from 2009 to 2013. From these, anomalous out-of-transit flux decrements indicated the possible existence of a Neptune-sized exomoon, as first reported by the Hunt for Exomoons with Kepler project in 2018. The Kepler data were inconclusive and so the planetary transit was re-observed by the Hubble Space Telescope in October 2018. The light curve from Hubble exhibited evidence for both a moon-like transit and a transit timing variation, both of which were consistent as being caused by the same Neptune-sized moon in orbit of Kepler-1625b. The transit timing variation has been independently recovered by two teams analyzing the same data. One of these teams also independently recovered the moon-like transit, but suggest that radial velocity measurements are needed to exclude the possibility of a close-in masquerading planet. The other team are unable to recover the moon-like transit and suggested it may be an artifact of the data reduction. This conclusion was challenged by the original team soon after, who showed that the other analysis exhibits larger systematics that may explain their differing conclusion.

== See also ==
- Kepler-1708
- 1SWASP J140747.93-394542.6
- PDS 110
