= Lunar system =

Lunar system may refer to:

- Earth–Moon system
- The Hill sphere of a moon
- Subsatellite, a natural or artificial satellite orbiting another natural satellite
- Lunar calendar, a calendar system based on Earth's moon
