= Hunt for Exomoons with Kepler =

Space research project

- Nickname: HEK
- Established: December 30, 2011
- Research type: Basic
- Field of research: Astrophysics
- Principal investigator: David Kipping
- Staff: Gáspár Bakos; Lars Buchhave; Joel Hartman; David Nesvorný; Allan Schmitt
- Affiliations: Center for Astrophysics | Harvard & Smithsonian

The Hunt for Exomoons with Kepler (HEK) was a project whose aim was to search for exomoons, natural satellites of exoplanets, using data collected by the Kepler space telescope. Founded by British exomoonologist David Kipping and affiliated with the Center for Astrophysics | Harvard & Smithsonian, HEK submitted its first paper on June 30, 2011. HEK later submitted five additional papers from 2013 to 2017. In July 2017, it found some evidence for an exomoon around Kepler-1625b.

== Scientific work ==
HEK searched for exomoons through radial-velocity variation and transit-timing variation, both of which were based on alterations to the basic signal produced by the planet. For moons detected the first way, the sinusoidal changes in the wavelength of the light of the host star created by the planet may themselves be modulated slightly by a moon of the planet. In the second method, the interval at which a planet transits its host star may be made slightly shorter or longer under the gravitational influence of a moon, revealing its existence.

In its first paper, the Hunt for Exomoons with Kepler selected several Kepler planet candidates as search targets, based on the probability and detectability of potential moons around the planets. A second paper, published in early 2013, covering the properties of seven of the planet candidates, revealed no moons but allowed the astronomers to constrain the moon-to-planet mass ratios for the planets. A third paper, accepted by the Astrophysical Journal, analyzed the transit and radial-velocity signals of Kepler-22b, the first and only habitable-zone planet analyzed by the HEK team as of July 2013. As with previous searches, though, no moons were conclusively discovered, constraining the maximum mass of a Kepler-22b moon below 0.54 Earth masses with 95% confidence.

Despite the lack of positive results in one-and-a-half years of operation, several commentators, including Shannon Hall of Universe Today and Markus Hammonds of Discovery News, have expressed hope that there are billions of exomoons, many habitable, remaining to be found in the Milky Way. Citing the fact that the first exoplanets were not found in the first discovery efforts, and the fact that the Milky Way is extremely large and diverse, both commentators contend that exomoons will be found eventually.

In July 2017, the project reported weak evidence for a set of Io-like moons, and evidence for a moon around the planet orbiting Kepler-1625.
