= System (disambiguation) =

A system is a set of entities, real or abstract, comprising a whole.

System may also refer to:

== Science and technology ==
- Biological system, a complex network of biological entities, for instance, a group of organs
- Ecosystem, an entity comprising a large number of organisms and their environment
- Energy system, an interpretation of the energy sector in system terms
- Binary system (disambiguation), term is used for multiple purposes, such as:
  - Binary system (astronomy), a system of two celestial bodies on a mutual orbit
- Star or stellar system, is a system of any multiple number of stars
- Planetary system, gravitationally bound non-stellar objects in or out of orbit around a star or star system
- Satellite system (astronomy), is a set of gravitationally bound non-planetary objects in orbit of a planetary mass object or minor planet, or its barycenter
- Ring system, is a system of cosmic dust or moonlets, forming rings around, and gravitationally bound to a host non-stellar body.
- Physical system, that portion of the physical universe chosen for analysis
- Thermodynamic system, a body of matter and/or radiation, confined in space by walls, with defined permeabilities, which separate it from its surroundings
- Systems science, an interdisciplinary field that studies the nature of complex systems in nature, society, and science
- System (stratigraphy), a unit of the geologic record of a rock column
- Systems engineering, a field about design, integration, and management of complex systems
- System of equations, a set of mathematical equations

=== Computing ===
- Computer system, the combination of hardware and software which forms a complete, working computer
  - Operating system
- system, a C process control function in the C Standard Library used to execute subprocesses and commands
- System (typeface), a raster font packaged with Microsoft Windows

== Social science ==
- Economic system, covering the production and distribution of goods and services
- Social system, based on the interrelationships between individuals, groups, and institutions

== Music ==
- System (music notation), a collection of staves to be played simultaneously
- System (album), a 2007 album by Seal
- "System", a song by Chester Bennington from the Queen of the Damned soundtrack
- "System", a song by Jonathan Davis on his 2007 album Alone I Play
- "System", a song by Labelle on their 2008 album Back to Now
- "System", a song by Reks on his 2009 album More Grey Hairs
- "System", a song by Dave on his 2021 album We're All Alone in This Together
- System, a Danish electronic trio consisting of Anders Remmer, Jesper Skaaning, and Thomas Knak
- System of a Down, an Armenian-American heavy metal band also known as "System"

== Other uses ==
- System (journal), a scientific journal
- System (magazine)
- "System" (The Bear), the pilot episode of The Bear TV series
- "System", the collective term for all of a plural person's headmates

== See also ==
- Classic Mac OS versions 1 through 7 were known as "System 1" through "System 7"
- Meta-system, something composed of multiple smaller systems
- The System (disambiguation)
- Systematics (disambiguation)
- Systema (disambiguation)
- List of systems engineering images
- Government
- Law
- Bureaucracy
