= Satellite system (astronomy) =

Set of gravitationally bound objects in orbit

Artist's concept of the Saturnian satellite system

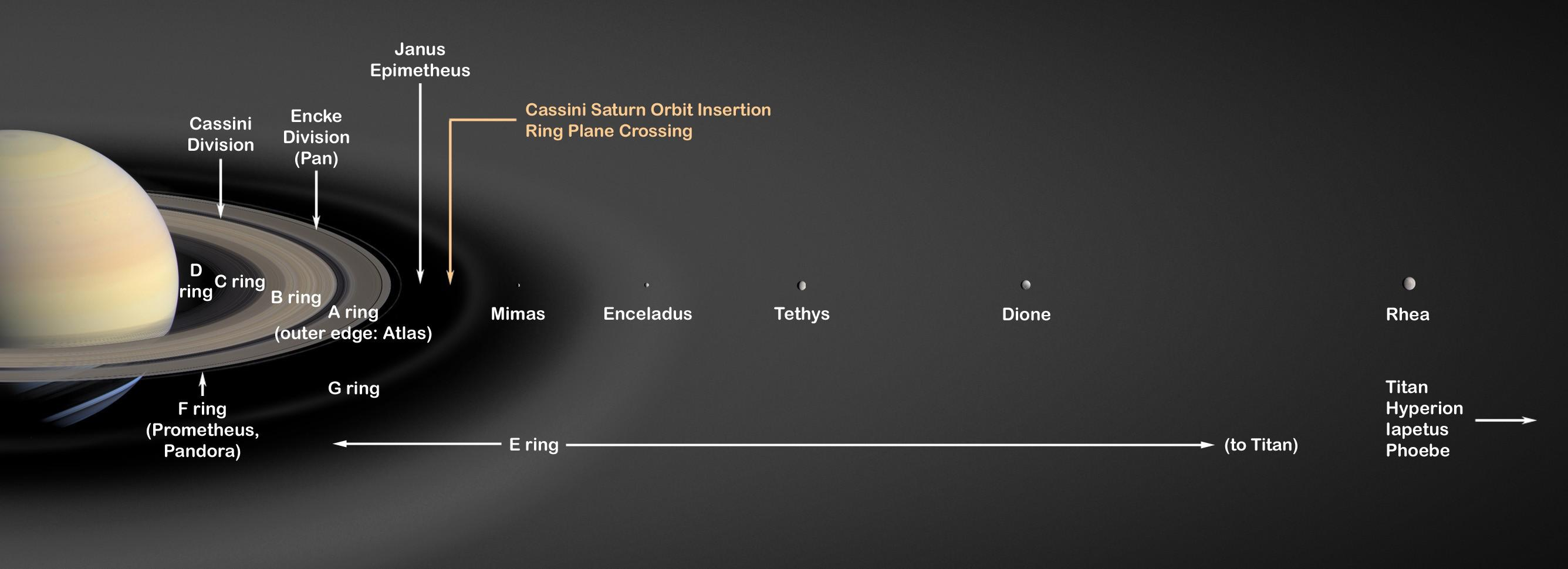
Saturn, its rings and major icy moons—from Mimas to Rhea.

A satellite system is a set of gravitationally bound objects in orbit around a planetary mass object (incl. sub-brown dwarfs and rogue planets) or minor planet, or its barycenter. Generally speaking, it is a set of natural satellites (moons), although such systems may also consist of bodies such as circumplanetary disks, ring systems, moonlets, minor-planet moons and artificial satellites any of which may themselves have satellite systems of their own (see Subsatellites). Some bodies also possess quasi-satellites that have orbits gravitationally influenced by their primary, but are generally not considered to be part of a satellite system. Satellite systems can have complex interactions including magnetic, tidal, atmospheric and orbital interactions such as orbital resonances and libration. Individually major satellite objects are designated in Roman numerals. Satellite systems are referred to either by the possessive adjectives of their primary (e.g. "Jovian system"), or less commonly by the name of their primary (e.g. "Jupiter system"). Where only one satellite is known, or it is a binary with a common centre of gravity, it may be referred to using the hyphenated names of the primary and major satellite (e.g. the "Earth–Moon system").

Many Solar System objects are known to possess satellite systems, though their origin is still unclear. Notable examples include the Jovian system, with 115 known moons (including the large Galilean moons) and the largest overall, the Saturnian system, with 293 known moons (including Titan and the most visible rings in the Solar System alongside). Both satellite systems are large and diverse, in fact, all of the giant planets of the Solar System possess large satellite systems as well as planetary rings, and it is inferred that this is a general pattern. Several objects farther from the Sun also have satellite systems consisting of multiple moons, including the complex Plutonian system where multiple objects orbit a common center of mass, as well as many asteroids and plutinos. Apart from the Earth–Moon system and Mars' system of two tiny natural satellites, the other terrestrial planets are generally not considered satellite systems, although some have been orbited by artificial satellites originating from Earth.

Little is known of satellite systems beyond the Solar System, although it is inferred that natural satellites are common. Possible signs of exomoons have been detected around exoplanets such as Kepler-1625b. It is also theorised that rogue planets ejected from their planetary system could retain a system of satellites.

== Natural formation and evolution ==
Satellite systems, like planetary systems, are the product of gravitational attraction, but are also sustained through fictitious forces. While the general consensus is that most planetary systems are formed from accretionary disks, the formation of satellite systems is less clear. The origin of many moons are investigated on a case-by-case basis, and the larger systems are thought to have formed through a combination of one or more processes.

=== System stability ===
Gravitational accelerations at L_{4}

The Hill sphere is the region in which an astronomical body dominates the attraction of satellites. Of the Solar System planets, Neptune and Uranus have the largest Hill spheres, due to the lessened gravitational influence of the Sun at their far orbits, however all of the giant planets have Hill spheres in the vicinity of 100 million kilometres in radius. By contrast, the Hill spheres of Mercury and Ceres, being closer to the Sun are quite small. Outside of the Hill sphere, the Sun dominates the gravitational influence, with the exception of the Lagrangian points.

Satellites are stable at the L_{4} and L_{5} Lagrangian points. These lie at the third corners of the two equilateral triangles in the plane of orbit whose common base is the line between the centers of the two masses, such that the point lies behind (L_{5}) or ahead (L_{4}) of the smaller mass with regard to its orbit around the larger mass. The triangular points (L_{4} and L_{5}) are stable equilibria, provided that the ratio of M_{1}/M_{2} is nearly 24.96. (Note: More precisely, $\tfrac{25+\sqrt{621}}{2}$ ≈ 24.9599357944) When a body at these points is perturbed, it moves away from the point, but the factor opposite of that which is increased or decreased by the perturbation (either gravity or angular momentum-induced speed) will also increase or decrease, bending the object's path into a stable, kidney-bean-shaped orbit around the point (as seen in the corotating frame of reference).

It is generally thought that natural satellites should orbit in the same direction as the planet is rotating (known as prograde orbit). As such, the terminology regular moon is used for these orbits. However a retrograde orbit (the opposite direction to the planet) is also possible, the terminology irregular moon is used to describe known exceptions to the rule, it is believed that irregular moons have been inserted into orbit through gravitational capture.

=== Accretion theories ===
Accretion disks around giant planets may occur in a similar way to the occurrence of disks around stars, out of which planets form (for example, this is one of the theories for the formations of the satellite systems of Uranus, Saturn, and Jupiter). This early cloud of gas is a type of circumplanetary disk known as a proto-satellite disk (in the case of the Earth–Moon system, the proto-lunar disk). Models of gas during the formation of planets coincide with a general rule for planet-to-satellite(s) mass ratio of 10,000:1 (a notable exception is Neptune). Accretion is also proposed by some as a theory for the origin of the Earth–Moon system, however the angular momentum of system and the Moon's smaller iron core can not easily be explained by this.

==== Debris disks ====
Another proposed mechanism for satellite system formation is accretion from debris. Scientists theorise that the Galilean moons are thought by some to be a more recent generation of moons formed from the disintegration of earlier generations of accreted moons. Ring systems are a type of circumplanetary disk that can be the result of satellites disintegrated near the Roche limit. Such disks could, over time, coalesce to form natural satellites.

=== Collision theories ===
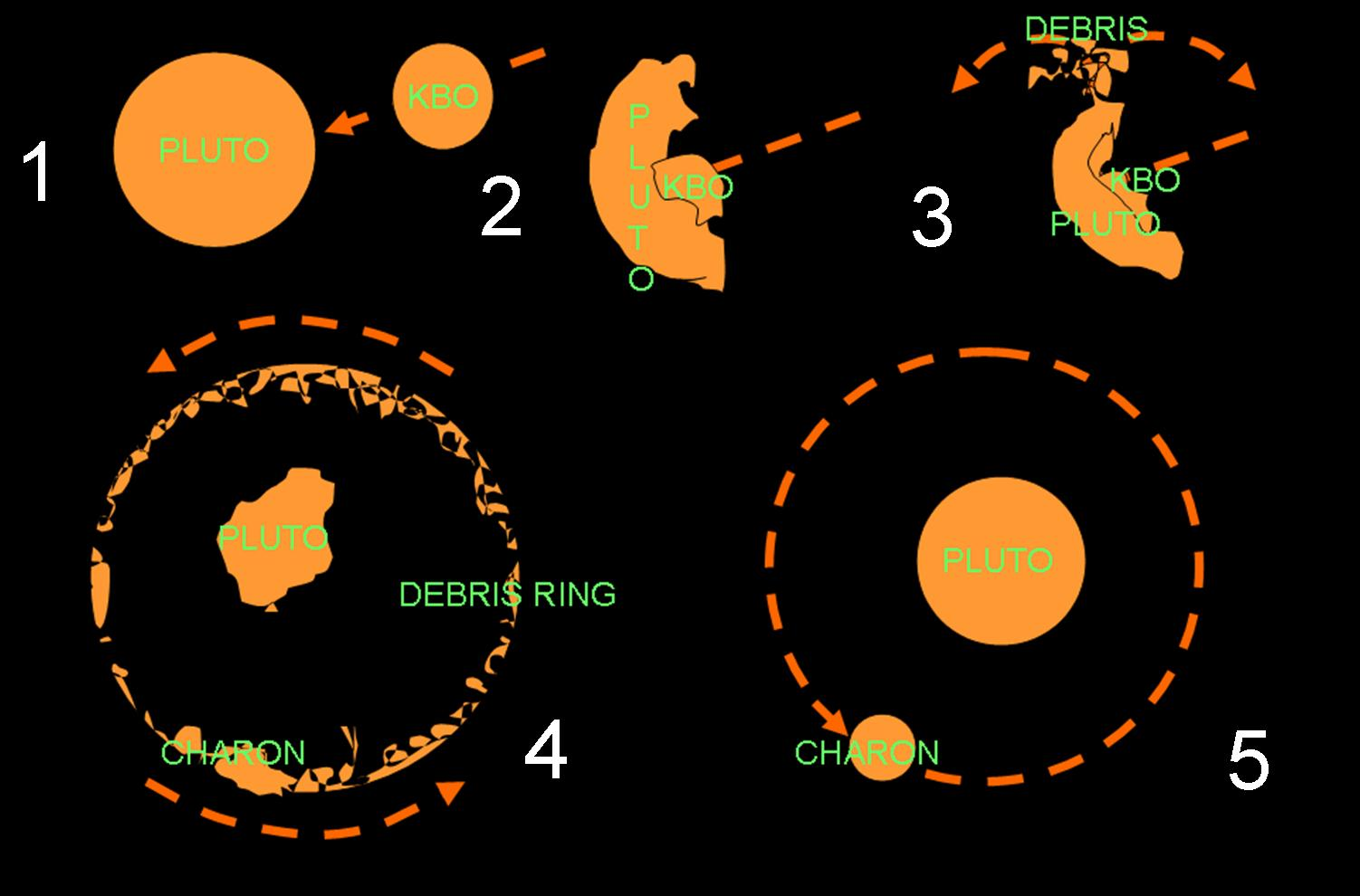
Formation of Pluto's moons. 1: a Kuiper belt object nears Pluto; 2: the KBO impacts Pluto; 3: a dust ring forms around Pluto; 4: the debris aggregates to form Charon; 5: Pluto and Charon relax into spherical bodies.

Collision is one of the leading theories for the formation of satellite systems, particularly those of the Earth and Pluto. Objects in such a system may be part of a collisional family and this origin may be verified comparing their orbital elements and composition. Computer simulations have been used to demonstrate that giant impacts could have been the origin of the Moon. It is thought that early Earth had multiple moons resulting from the giant impact. Similar models have been used to explain the creation of the Plutonian system as well as those of other Kuiper belt objects and asteroids. This is also a prevailing theory for the origin of the moons of Mars. Both sets of findings support an origin of Phobos from material ejected by an impact on Mars that reaccreted in Martian orbit. Collision is also used to explain peculiarities in the Uranian system. Models developed in 2018 explain the planet's unusual spin support an oblique collision with an object twice the size of Earth which likely to have re-coalesced to form the system's icy moons.

=== Gravitational capture theories ===
Animation illustrating a controversial asteroid-belt theory for the origin of the Martian satellite system

Some theories suggest that gravitational capture is the origin of Neptune's major moon Triton, the moons of Mars, and Saturn's moon Phoebe. Some scientists have put forward extended atmospheres around young planets as a mechanism for slowing the movement of a passing objects to aid in capture. The hypothesis has been put forward to explain the irregular satellite orbits of Jupiter and Saturn, for example. A tell-tale sign of capture is a retrograde orbit, which can result from an object approaching the side of the planet which it is rotating towards. Capture has even been proposed as the origin of Earth's Moon. In the case of the latter, however, virtually identical isotope ratios found in samples of the Earth and Moon cannot be explained easily by this theory.

==== Temporary capture ====
Evidence for the natural process of satellite capture has been found in direct observation of objects captured by Jupiter. Five such captures have been observed, the longest being for approximately twelve years. Based on computer modelling, the future capture of comet 111P/Helin-Roman-Crockett for 18 years is predicted to begin in 2068. However temporary captured orbits have highly irregular and unstable, the theorised processes behind stable capture may be exceptionally rare.

== Features and interactions ==
Natural satellite systems, particularly those involving multiple planetary mass objects can have complex interactions which can have effects on multiple bodies or across the wider system.

=== Ring systems ===
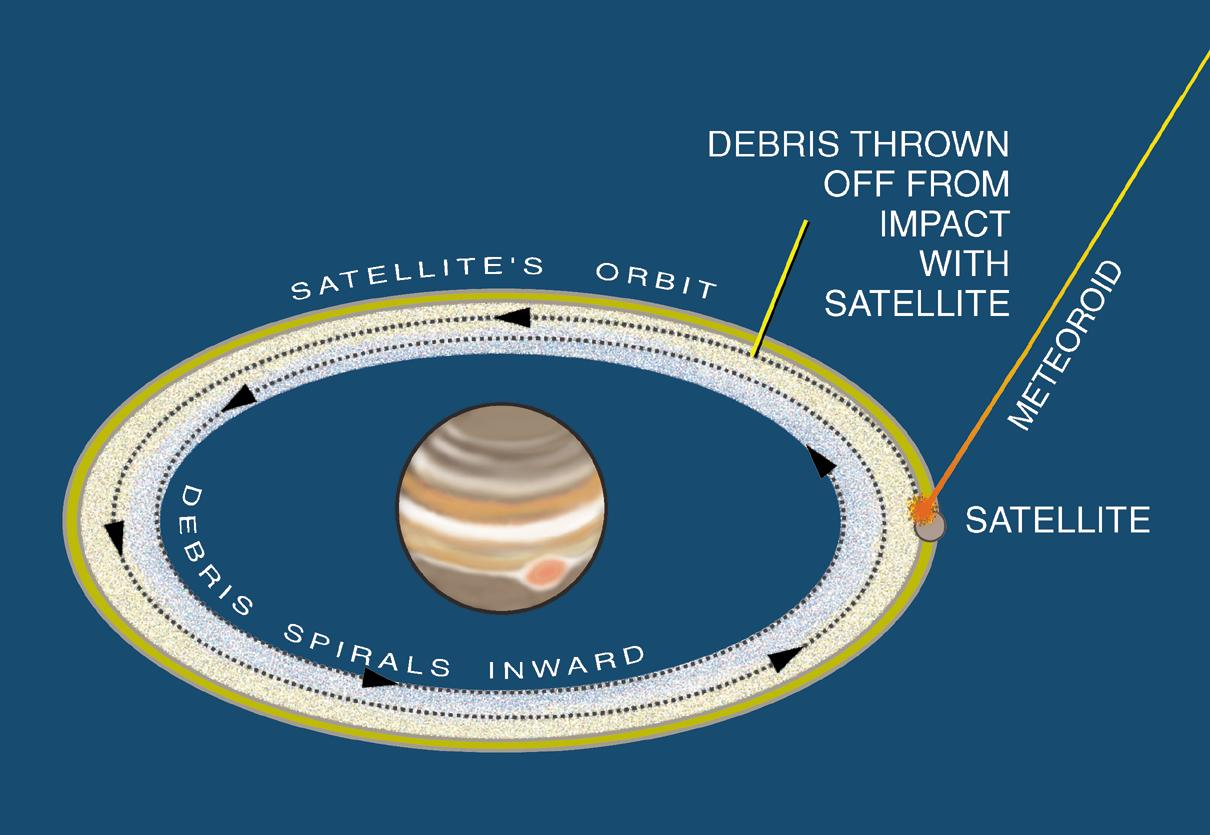
Model for formation of Jupiter's rings

Ring systems are collections of dust, moonlets, or other small objects. The most notable examples are those around Saturn, but the other three giant planets (Jupiter, Uranus and Neptune) also have ring systems.

Other objects have also been found to possess rings. Haumea was the first dwarf planet and trans-Neptunian object found to possess a ring system. Centaur 10199 Chariklo, with a diameter of about 250 kilometres (160 mi), is the smallest object with rings ever discovered consisting of two narrow and dense bands, 6–7 km (4 mi) and 2–4 km (2 mi) wide, separated by a gap of 9 kilometres (6 mi). The Saturnian moon Rhea may have a tenuous ring system consisting of three narrow, relatively dense bands within a particulate disk, the first predicted around a moon.

Most rings were thought to be unstable and to dissipate over the course of tens or hundreds of millions of years. Studies of Saturn's rings however indicate that they may date to the early days of the Solar System. Current theories suggest that some ring systems may form in repeating cycles, accreting into natural satellites that break up as soon as they reach the Roche limit. This theory has been used to explain the longevity of Saturn's rings as well the moons of Mars.

=== Gravitational interactions ===
==== Orbital configurations ====
The Laplace resonance exhibited by three of the Galilean moons. The ratios in the figure are of orbital periods. Conjunctions are highlighted by brief color changes.

Plot of vertical position y vs time t of the animation above.

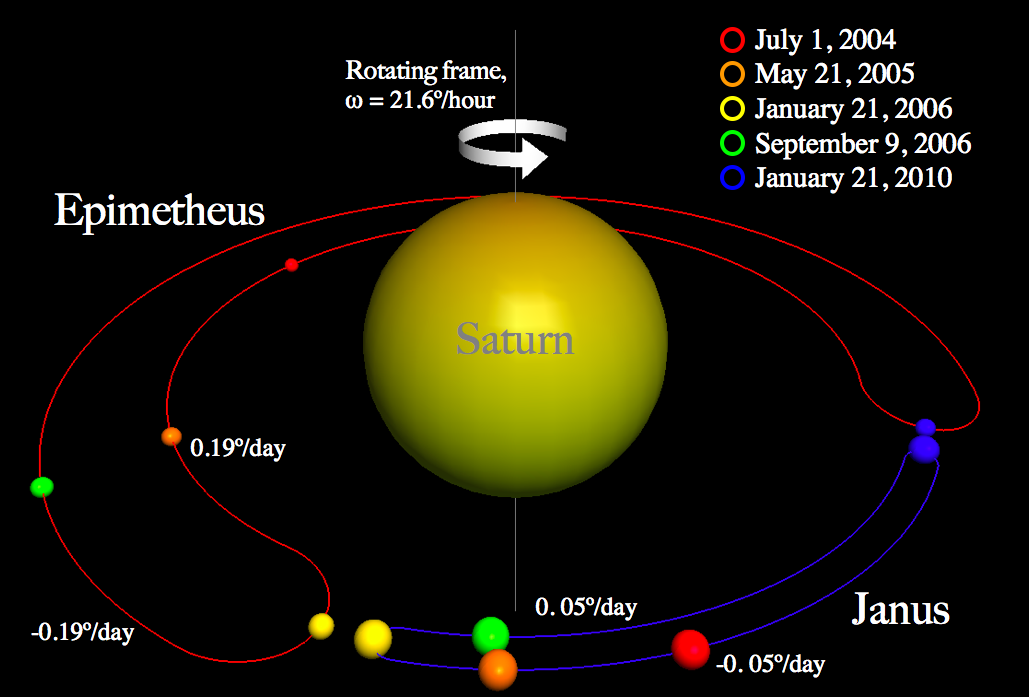
Rotating-frame depiction of the horseshoe exchange orbits of Janus and Epimetheus

Cassini's laws describe the motion of satellites within a system with their precessions defined by the Laplace plane. Most satellite systems are found orbiting the ecliptic plane of the primary. An exception is Earth's moon, which orbits in to the planet's equatorial plane.

When orbiting bodies exert a regular, periodic gravitational influence on each other is known as orbital resonance. Orbital resonances are present in several satellite systems:

- 2:4 Tethys–Mimas (Saturn's moons)
- 1:2 Dione–Enceladus (Saturn's moons)
- 3:4 Hyperion–Titan (Saturn's moons)
- 1:2:4 Ganymede–Europa–Io (Jupiter's moons)
- 1:3:4:5:6 near resonances - Styx, Nix, Kerberos, and Hydra (Pluto's moons) (Styx approximately 5.4% from resonance, Nix approximately 2.7%, Kerberos approximately 0.6%, and Hydra approximately 0.3%).

Other possible orbital interactions include libration and co-orbital configuration. The Saturnian moons Janus and Epimetheus share their orbits, the difference in semi-major axes being less than either's mean diameter. Libration is a perceived oscillating motion of orbiting bodies relative to each other. The Earth–Moon satellite system is known to produce this effect.

Several systems are known to orbit a common centre of mass and are known as binary companions. The most notable system is the Plutonian system, which is also dwarf planet binary. Several minor planets also share this configuration, including "true binaries" with near equal mass, such as 90 Antiope and (66063) 1998 RO1. Some orbital interactions and binary configurations have been found to cause smaller moons to take non-spherical forms and "tumble" chaotically rather than rotate, as in the case of Nix, Hydra (moons of Pluto) and Hyperion (moon of Saturn).

==== Tidal interaction ====
Diagram of the Earth–Moon system showing how the tidal bulge is pushed ahead by Earth's rotation. This offset bulge exerts a net torque on the Moon, boosting it while slowing Earth's rotation.

Tidal energy including tidal acceleration can have effects on both the primary and satellites. The Moon's tidal forces deform the Earth and hydrosphere, similarly heat generated from tidal friction on the moons of other planets is found to be responsible for their geologically active features. Another extreme example of physical deformity is the massive equatorial ridge of the near-Earth asteroid 66391 Moshup created by the tidal forces of its moon, such deformities may be common among near-Earth asteroids.

Tidal interactions also cause stable orbits to change over time. For instance, Triton's orbit around Neptune is decaying and 28 billion years from now, it is predicted that this will cause Triton to pass within Neptune's Roche limit resulting in either a collision with Neptune's atmosphere or the breakup of Triton, forming a large ring similar to that found around Saturn. A similar process is drawing Phobos closer to Mars, and it is predicted that in 50 million years it will either collide with the planet or break up into a planetary ring. Tidal acceleration, on the other hand, gradually moves the Moon away from Earth, such that it may eventually be released from its gravitational bounding and exit the system.

==== Perturbation and instability ====
While tidal forces from the primary are common on satellites, most satellite systems remain stable. Perturbation between satellites can occur, particularly in the early formation, as the gravity of satellites affect each other, and can result in ejection from the system or collisions between satellites or with the primary. Simulations show that such interactions cause the orbits of the inner moons of the Uranus system to be chaotic and possibly unstable. Some of Io's active can be explained by perturbation from Europa's gravity as their orbits resonate. Perturbation has been suggested as a reason that Neptune does not follow the 10,000:1 ratio of mass between the parent planet and collective moons as seen in all other known giant planets. One theory of the Earth-Moon system suggest that a second companion which formed at the same time as the Moon, was perturbed by the Moon early in the system's history, causing it to impact with the Moon.

=== Atmospheric and magnetic interaction ===
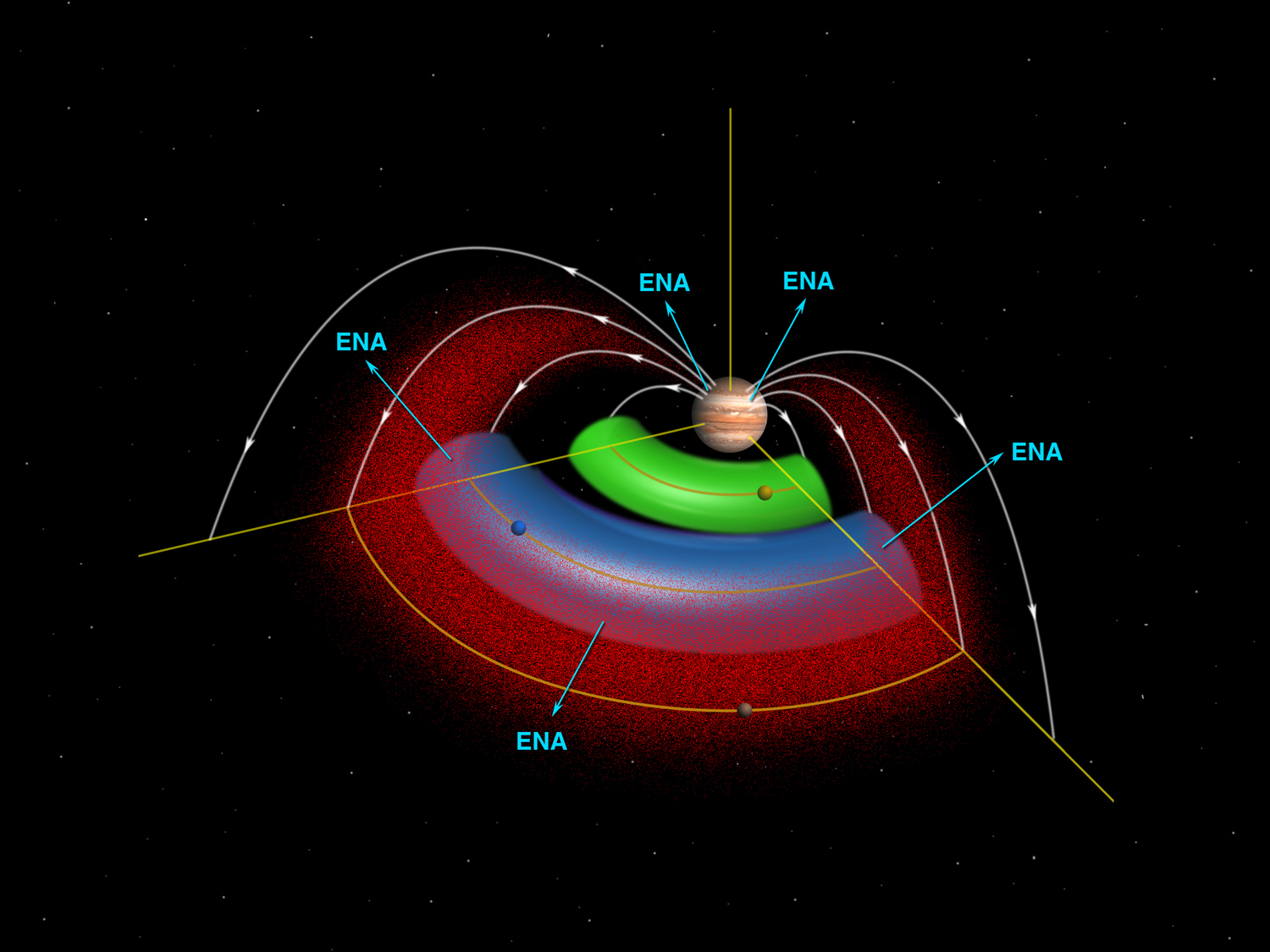
Gas toruses in the Jovian system generated by Io (green) and Europa (blue)

Some satellite systems have been known to have gas interactions between objects. Notable examples include the Jupiter, Saturn and Pluto systems. The Io plasma torus is a transfer of oxygen and sulfur from the tenuous atmosphere of Jupiter's volcanic moon, Io and other objects including Jupiter and Europa. A torus of oxygen and hydrogen produced by Saturn's moon, Enceladus forms part of the E ring around Saturn. Nitrogen gas transfer between Pluto and Charon has also been modelled and is expected to be observable by the New Horizons space probe. Similar tori produced by Saturn's moon Titan (nitrogen) and Neptune's moon Triton (hydrogen) is predicted.

Image of Jupiter's northern aurorae, showing the main auroral oval, the polar emissions, and the spots generated by the interaction with Jupiter's natural satellites

Complex magnetic interactions have been observed in satellite systems. Most notably, the interaction of Jupiter's strong magnetic field with those of Ganymede and Io. Observations suggest that such interactions can cause the stripping of atmospheres from moons and the generation of spectacular auroras.

== History ==
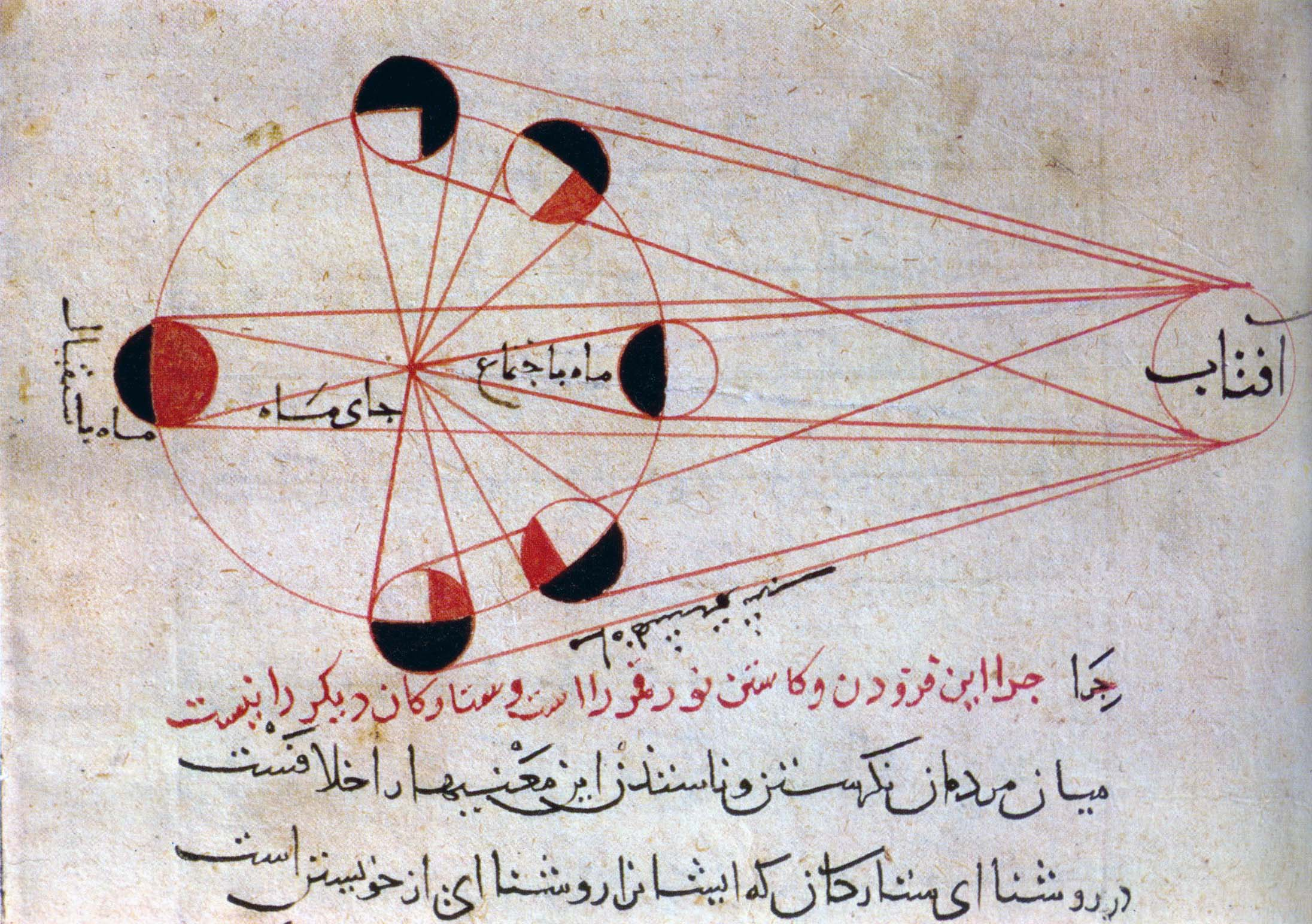
An illustration from al-Biruni's astronomical works, explains the different phases of the Moon, with respect to the position of the Sun.

The notion of satellite systems pre-dates history. The Moon was known by the earliest humans. The earliest models of astronomy were based around celestial bodies (or a "celestial sphere") orbiting the Earth. This idea was known as geocentrism (where the Earth is the centre of the universe). However the geocentric model did not generally accommodate the possibility of celestial objects orbiting other observed planets, such as Venus or Mars.

Seleucus of Seleucia (b. 190 BCE) made observations which may have included the phenomenon of tides, which he supposedly theorized to be caused by the attraction to the Moon and by the revolution of the Earth around an Earth–Moon 'center of mass'.

As heliocentrism (the doctrine that the Sun is the centre of the universe) began to gain in popularity in the 16th century, the focus shifted to planets and the idea of systems of planetary satellites fell out of general favour. Nevertheless, in some of these models, the Sun and Moon would have been satellites of the Earth.

Nicholas Copernicus published a model in which the Moon orbited around the Earth in the Dē revolutionibus orbium coelestium (On the Revolutions of the Celestial Spheres), in the year of his death, 1543.

It was not until the discovery of the Galilean moons in either 1609 or 1610 by Galileo, that the first definitive proof was found for celestial bodies orbiting planets.

The first suggestion of a ring system was in 1655, when Christiaan Huygens thought that Saturn was surrounded by rings.

The first probe to explore a satellite system other than Earth was Mariner 7 in 1969, which observed Phobos. The twin probes Voyager 1 and Voyager 2 were the first to explore the Jovian system in 1979.

== Zones and habitability ==
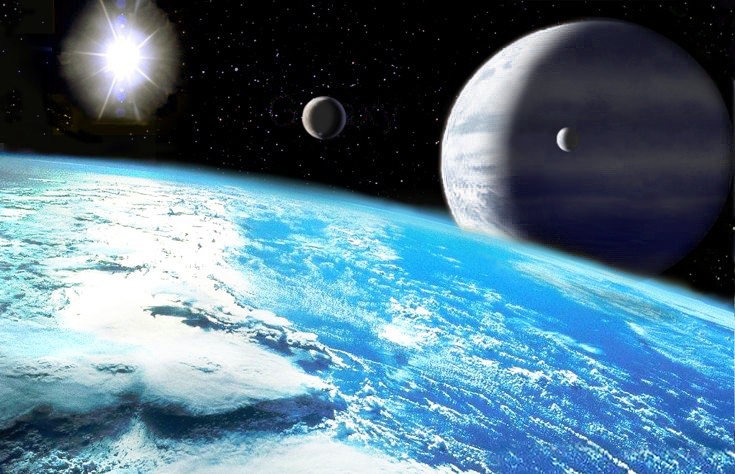
Artist's impression of a moon with surface water oceans orbiting within the circumstellar habitable zone

Based on tidal heating models, scientists have defined zones in satellite systems similarly to those of planetary systems. One such zone is the circumplanetary habitable zone (or "habitable edge"). According to this theory, moons closer to their planet than the habitable edge cannot support liquid water at their surface. When effects of eclipses as well as constraints from a satellite's orbital stability are included into this concept, one finds that — depending on a moon's orbital eccentricity — there is a minimum mass of roughly 0.2 solar masses for stars to host habitable moons within the stellar HZ.

The magnetic environment of exomoons, which is critically triggered by the intrinsic magnetic field of the host planet, has been identified as another effect on exomoon habitability. Most notably, it was found that moons at distances between about 5 and 20 planetary radii from a giant planet can be habitable from an illumination and tidal heating point of view, but still the planetary magnetosphere would critically influence their habitability.

== See also ==
- Minor-planet moon
- Subsatellite
- Double planet
- Quasi-satellite
- List of extraterrestrial orbiters
