= Systema (disambiguation) =

Systema is a Russian martial art.

Systema may also refer to:

- Systema Engineering, a Japanese airsoft gun manufacturer
- Systema (electronics), a UK brand of electronics including the TV Boy and Systema 2000
- Systēma, a Greek word for system
- Systema, a Japanese toothpaste brand by Lion Corporation

== See also ==
- Systema Naturae, a 1735 taxonomy book by Carl Linnaeus
- Sistema (disambiguation)
- System (disambiguation)
