= Systemic =

Systemic fundamental to a predominant social, economic, or political practice. This refers to:

== In medicine ==
In medicine, systemic means affecting the whole body, or at least multiple organ systems. It is in contrast with topical or local.

- Systemic administration, a route of administration of medication so that the entire body is affected
- Systemic circulation, carries oxygenated blood from the heart to the body and then returns deoxygenated blood back to the heart
- Systemic disease, an illness that affects multiple organs, systems or tissues, or the entire body
- Systemic effect, an adverse effect of an exposure that affects the body as a whole, rather than one part
- Systemic inflammatory response syndrome, an inflammatory state affecting the whole body, frequently in response to infection
- Systemic lupus erythematosus, a chronic autoimmune connective tissue disease that can affect any part of the body
- Systemic scleroderma, also known as systemic sclerosis, a systemic connective tissue disease
- Systemic venous system, refers to veins that drain into the right atrium without passing through two vascular beds
- Systemic exertion intolerance disease, a new name for chronic fatigue syndrome proposed by the Institute of Medicine in 2015

== In biology ==
- Systemic acquired resistance, a "whole-plant" resistance response that occurs following an earlier localized exposure to a pathogen
- Systemic pesticide, a pesticide that enters and moves freely within the organism under treatment

== Other uses ==
- Systemic (amateur extrasolar planet search project), a research project to locate extrasolar planets using distributed computing
- Systemic (album), a 2023 album by the band Divide and Dissolve
- Systemic bias, the inherent tendency of a process to favor particular outcomes
- Systemic functional grammar, a model of grammar that considers language as a system
- Systemic functional linguistics, an approach to linguistics that considers language as a system
- Systemic psychology or systems psychology, a branch of applied psychology based on systems theory and thinking
- Systemic risk, the risk of collapse of an entire financial system or market, as opposed to risk associated with any one entity
- Systemic shock, a shock to any system strong enough to drive it out of equilibrium, can refer to a change in many fields
- Systemic therapy, a school of psychology dealing with the interactions of groups and their interactional patterns and dynamics

== See also ==
- Systematic (disambiguation)
- Systematics (disambiguation)
- Systemics
