= The System =

The System may refer to:

== Literature ==
- The System, a book on chess by Hans Berliner
- The System, a comic book by Peter Kuper
- The System: The Glory and Scandal of Big-Time College Football, a 2013 book by Jeff Benedict and Armen Keteyian

== Music ==
- The System, an American record label in partnership with Warner Music.
- The System (band), an American synth pop duo founded in 1982 and disbanded in 1989
- "The System", a song by The Black Pacific from The Black Pacific
- "The System", a song by rapper Tom MacDonald
- "The System", a song by Inspectah Deck from Dragon's Breath
- El Sistema (Sp., "The System"), publicly financed music-education program originating in Venezuela

== Film ==
- The System (1953 film), an American crime film
- The System (1964 film), a British film
- The System (2014 film), a Pakistani action/drama film
- The System (2022 film), an American action film

== Sports ==
- The System (Gaelic football)
- The System, a strategy in basketball devised by Paul Westhead
- The System or Grinnell System, a fast-paced basketball strategy developed at Grinnell College
- Systema, a Russian martial art
- The System (professional wrestling), a stable in TNA Wrestling.

== Television ==
- The System, a 2008 television special starring Derren Brown

== Other uses ==
- The System, a derogatory term for the Weimar Republic
- The system may also refer to someone being placed in the database of prisons

== See also ==
- System (disambiguation)
