= Systematic =

Systematic may refer to:

== Science ==
- Short for systematic error
- Systematic fault
- Systematic bias, errors that are introduced by an inaccuracy inherent to the system

== Economy ==
- Systematic trading, a way of defining trade goals, risk controls and rules that can make investment and trading decisions in a methodical way
- Systematic Paris-Region: French business cluster devoted to complex systems

== Music ==
- Systematic (band), American hard rock band
- Systematic Chaos, a 2007 album by Dream Theater

== Others ==
- Systematic Software Engineering, a Danish software company

== See also ==
- Systematics (disambiguation)
- Systemic (disambiguation)
