= Marketing decision support system =

A marketing decision support system (sometimes abbreviated MKDSS) is a decision support system for marketing activity. The system is used to help businesses explore different scenarios by manipulating already collected data from past events. It consists of information technology, marketing data, systems tools, and modeling capabilities that enable it to provide predicted outcomes from different scenarios and marketing strategies. MKDSS assists decision makers in different scenarios and can be a useful tool for businesses to gain competitive advantages.

== Example ==
A MKDSS is used to support the software vendors’ planning strategy for marketing products. It can help to identify advantageous levels of pricing, advertising spending, and advertising copy for the firm's products. This helps determine the firm's marketing mix for product software.

== Decision support systems ==
The concepts involved in decision support systems were first expressed in the early 1970s by Scott Morton. These systems are used to help solve complex problems by using computer technology and can help businesses with decision making. DSS has progressed since it was first developed in the 70's. The main areas of research that DDS has developed from are theoretical and technological.

There are three types of DSS available: 1. available as a software application, 2. bespoke and 3. user-developed.

DSS typically incorporates several core functional components, including sophisticated database management capabilities with access to both internal and external data, information, and knowledge; modeling functions managed through a model management system; and user interface designs that support interactive queries, reporting, and graphing.

Although DSS have a range of different functions, they are designed to be user-friendly, flexible and capable of supporting graphical features.

== Use of decision support systems ==
DSS are used mainly used before a company invests their money into something. One of DSS's biggest benefits is its ability to predict the outcome of different scenarios, it can help businesses to save money by preventing failures.

Decision support systems can help businesses to save time as well. This can reduce the time spent on planning initiatives that are unlikely to succeed.

== Satisfaction ==
MDSS aims to improve the effectiveness of decision making and reduce costs by helping to eliminate unsuitable decisions.

DSS helps and improves the performance of decision makers by using a computer system.

A useful aspect of such a system is that it lets the business look forward instead of only examining the past to answer complex questions.
