= Subsatellite =

Satellite that orbits a natural satellite

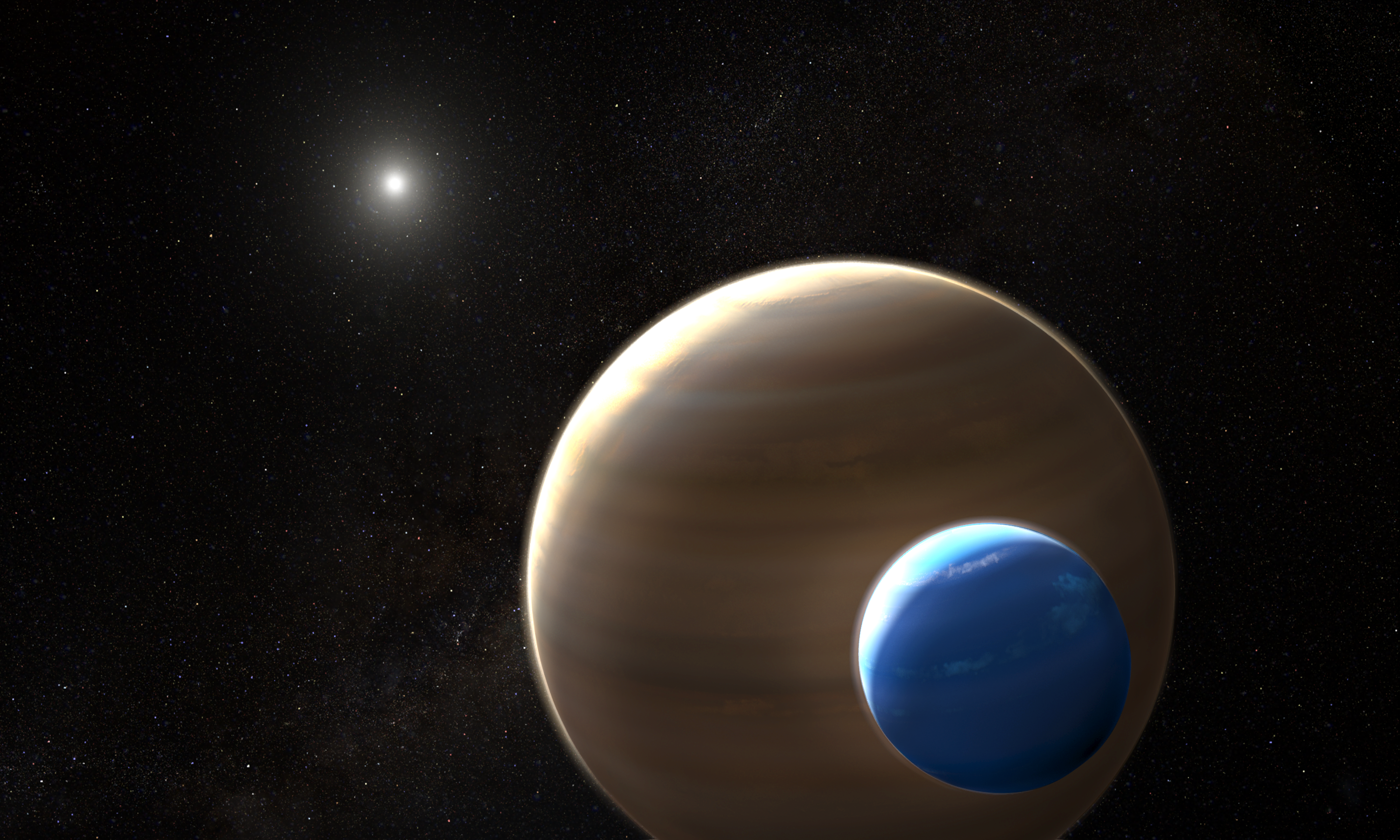
Artist's concept of exomoon Kepler-1625b I orbiting exoplanet Kepler-1625b. Kepler-1625b could theoretically have a subsatellite itself.

A subsatellite, also known as a submoon, moonlet or informally a moonmoon, is a "moon of a moon" or a hypothetical natural satellite that orbits the moon of a planet.

It is inferred from the empirical study of natural satellites in the Solar System that subsatellites may be rare, albeit possible, elements of planetary systems. In the Solar System, the giant planets have large collections of natural satellites. The majority of detected exoplanets are giant planets; at least one, Kepler-1625b, may have a very large exomoon, named Kepler-1625b I, which could theoretically host a subsatellite. Nonetheless, aside from human-launched satellites in temporary lunar orbit, no subsatellite is known in the Solar System or beyond. In most cases, the tidal effects of the planet would make such a system unstable on an astronomical timescale.

== Terminology ==
Terms used in scientific literature for subsatellites include "submoons" and "moon-moons". Colloquial terms that have been suggested include moonitos (compare plutino), moonettes, and moooons.

== Possible natural instances ==
=== Rhea ===
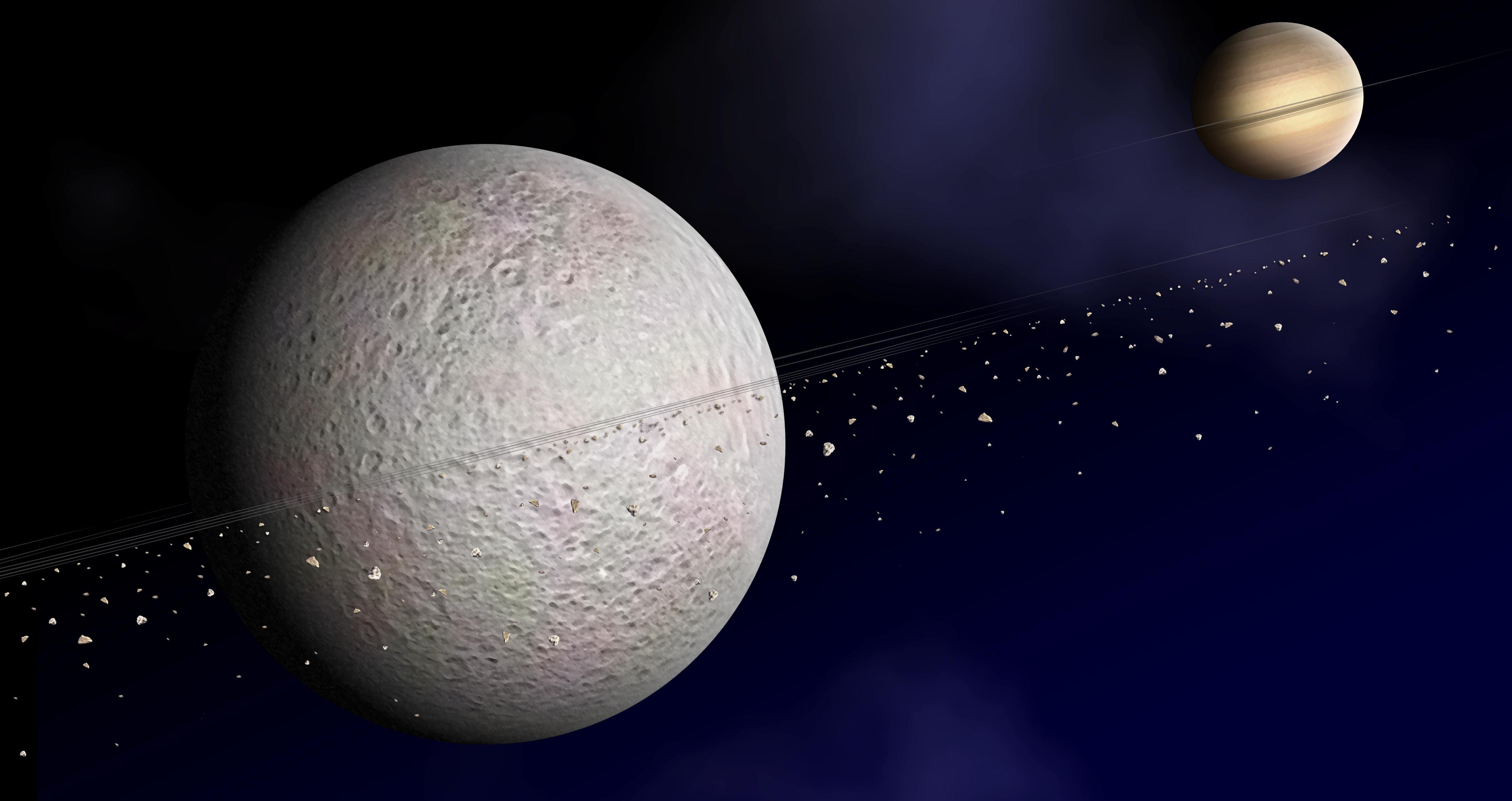
Artist's concept of rings around Rhea, a moon of Saturn

There is a possible detection of a ring system around Saturn's natural satellite Rhea that led to calculations that indicated that satellites orbiting Rhea would have stable orbits. The rings suspected were thought to be narrow, a phenomenon normally associated with shepherd moons; however, targeted images taken by the Cassini spacecraft failed to detect any subsatellites or rings associated with Rhea, at least no particles larger than a few millimeters, making the chance of a ring system around Rhea slim.

=== Iapetus ===
It has also been proposed that Saturn's satellite Iapetus possessed a subsatellite in the past; this is one of several hypotheses that have been put forward to account for its unusual equatorial ridge. An ancient giant impact on Iapetus could have produced a subsatellite; as Saturn despun Iapetus, the subsatellite's orbit would then decay until it crossed Iapetus' Roche limit, forming a transient ring which then impacted Iapetus to form a ridge. Such a scenario could have happened on the other giant-planet satellites as well, but only for Iapetus and perhaps Oberon would the resulting ridge have formed after the Late Heavy Bombardment and thus survived to the present day.

=== Irregular moons of Saturn ===
Light-curve analysis suggests that Saturn's irregular satellite Kiviuq is extremely prolate, and is likely a contact binary or even a binary moon. Other candidates among the Saturnian irregulars include Bestla, Erriapus, and Bebhionn.

== Artificial subsatellites ==
=== Historical ===
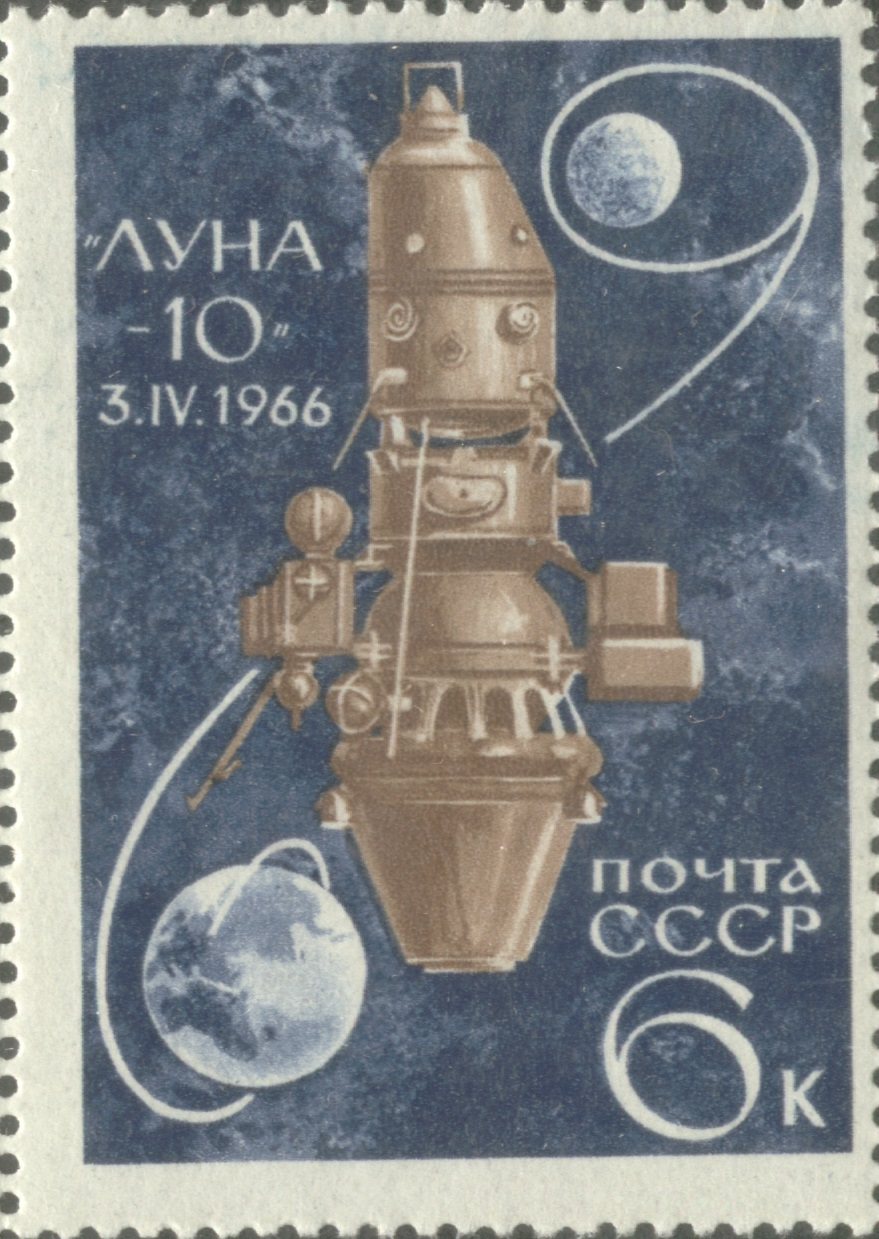
Stamp depicting the first extraterrestrial orbiter (Luna 10) other than in heliocentric orbit and its flightpath, the first artificial satellite around a natural satellite.

Many spacecraft have orbited the Moon, with the first being Luna 10 in 1966.

As of 2026, no spacecraft has successfully orbited any natural satellite other than the Moon. In 1988, the Soviet Union unsuccessfully attempted to put two robotic probes on quasi-orbits around the Martian moon Phobos.

=== Current ===
Launched June 18, 2009, the Lunar Reconnaissance Orbiter (LRO) is a NASA robotic spacecraft currently orbiting the Moon in an eccentric polar mapping orbit. Data collected by LRO have been described as essential for planning NASA's future human and robotic missions to the Moon. Its detailed mapping program is identifying safe landing sites, locating potential resources on the Moon, characterizing the radiation environment, and demonstrating new technologies.

Different classes of lunar orbits are selected according to mission objectives. Low polar orbits are typically used for global mapping and surface observations, while near-rectilinear halo orbits (NRHOs) provide long-term stability and continuous communication with Earth, making them well suited for sustained lunar exploration missions.

CAPSTONE is a project that successfully launched on June 28, 2022. Composed of a 12-unit collection of CubeSats which spent a few months in transit to the Moon to arrive on November 14, 2022. It has spent over 2 years in the Moon's Near-rectilinear halo orbit. CAPSTONE is testing and verifying the viability of the planned NRHO of planned future Lunar Gateway and its communication efficiency.

=== Future planned artificial moon satellites ===
The interplanetary spacecraft JUICE launched in 2023 will enter an orbit around Ganymede in 2034, becoming the first spacecraft to orbit a moon other than Earth's.

The Lunar Gateway was a planned space station to be constructed in a near-rectilinear halo orbit (NRHO), primarily in support of the later stage NASA Artemis program missions to the Moon. As of March 2026, the focus of the project has shifted towards a lunar surface base, but the station may be considered later.

== See also ==
- Binary asteroid
- Circumplanetary disk – Accumulation of matter around a planet
- Minor-planet moon
- Moons of Jupiter
- Moons of Neptune
- Moons of Saturn
- Moons of Uranus
- Satellite system (astronomy)
- Selam (moon) – a contact-binary satellite of 152830 Dinkinesh
- Three-body problem
