= Binary system (disambiguation) =

Binary system may refer to:

- Binary number system, the base-2 internal "machine language" of computers
- Binary opposition, a bipolar distinction in philosophy, structuralism and critical theory
- Binary system (astronomy), a system of two celestial bodies on a mutual orbit
  - Binary asteroid
  - Binary star
  - Contact binary
  - Contact binary (asteroid)
  - Double planet
- In chemistry, a system involving two steps, processes or substances
  - Mixture
  - Azeotrope
- Binary System, a music duo featuring rock musician Roger Miller
