= Kepler-1708b =

Gas giant exoplanet with a potential exomoon

Discovery
- Discovery date: 2019 (candidate); 2021 (confirmed)
- Detection method: Transit

Designations
- Alternative names: KIC 7906827.01

Orbital characteristics
- Semi-major axis: 1.64±0.10 AU
- Eccentricity: <0.40
- Orbital period (sidereal): 737.1131+0.00146 −0.00770 d
- Inclination: 89.92°+0.03° −0.01°
- Known satellites: Kepler-1708b I?
- Star: Kepler-1708

Physical characteristics
- Mean radius: 0.8886+0.0535 −0.0526 R_{J}
- Mass: <4.6 M_{J}

Kepler-1708b (previously known as KIC 7906827.01) is a Jupiter-sized exoplanet orbiting the Sun-like star Kepler-1708, located in the constellation of Cygnus approximately 5,600 light years away from Earth. It was first detected in 2011 by NASA's Kepler mission using the transit method, but was not identified as a candidate planet until 2019. In 2021, a candidate Neptune-sized exomoon in orbit around Kepler-1708b was found by astronomer David Kipping and colleagues in an analysis using Kepler transit data. Some subsequent research has raised discrepancies about the possible existence of an exomoon, similar to that of Kepler-1625b but even more recent research still finds the existence of an exomoon likely.

== Characteristics ==
=== Mass and radius ===
Kepler-1708b is a gas giant planet slightly smaller than Jupiter in size, with a radius of 0.89 Jupiter radii. The mass of the planet remains yet to be measured; precise analysis of its transit timings place a 2-sigma upper limit of <4.6 Jupiter masses. This mass upper limit predicts a maximum radial velocity amplitude of <98 m/s—although within reach of the most precise spectrographs available, the faintness of Kepler-1708b's host star would make observations difficult.

=== Orbit and temperature ===
Kepler-1708b orbits about 1.64 astronomical units from its host star and completes one revolution every 737.11 days or 2.02 years, comparable to the orbit of Mars in the Solar System. At this distance, Kepler-1708b lies within the habitable zone of its host star, where it receives an insolation flux 0.561+0.074
−0.068 times that of Earth at a relatively cool equilibrium temperature of 200–300 kelvins (−73–27 °C; −100–80 °F). The eccentricity of its orbit is unmeasured and is given a 2-sigma upper limit of <0.40.

== Host star ==
Kepler-1708b orbits around the Sun-like star Kepler-1708, located in the constellation of Cygnus 5,580 ± 240 ly (1,712 ± 75 pc) light years away from Earth. At an apparent magnitude of 16, this star is too faint to be seen by the naked eye. The star's celestial coordinates based on the J2000 epoch are: RA 19^{h} 47^{m} 17.79^{s}, Dec 43° 37′ 29.4″. The European Space Agency's Gaia satellite has measured a stellar parallax of 0.5730±0.0340 milliarcseconds (mas) and directional proper motion components of RA −0.770±0.057 mas/yr, Dec −5.005±0.059 mas/yr. Kepler-1708 is known by other designations from various star catalogues including: UCAC4 669-077544, KIC 7906827, TIC 272716898, 2MASS J19471778+4337295, WISE J194717.78+433729.2, and Gaia DR2 2078801971283008128.

Kepler-1708 is slightly larger and more massive than the Sun, with a mass of 1.088±0.072 M_{☉} and radius of 1.117±0.064 R_{☉}. It is also hotter and more luminous than the Sun, with an effective temperature of 6,157+231
−202 K and a bolometric luminosity of 1.521 L_{☉}. (Note: Luminosity calculated from the inverse of $\log_{10}{(L_{\ast})} = 0.182 \pm 0.082$ from Kipping et al. (2022)) Based on these properties, Kepler-1708 is likely an F-type main sequence star with a Sun-like metallicity of [Fe/H] = 0.0±0.2 dex and an age of 3.16±2.26 billion years. (Note: Age calculated from the inverse of $\log_{10}{(A)} = 9.50 \pm 0.31$ from Kipping et al. (2022))

== Potential exomoon ==
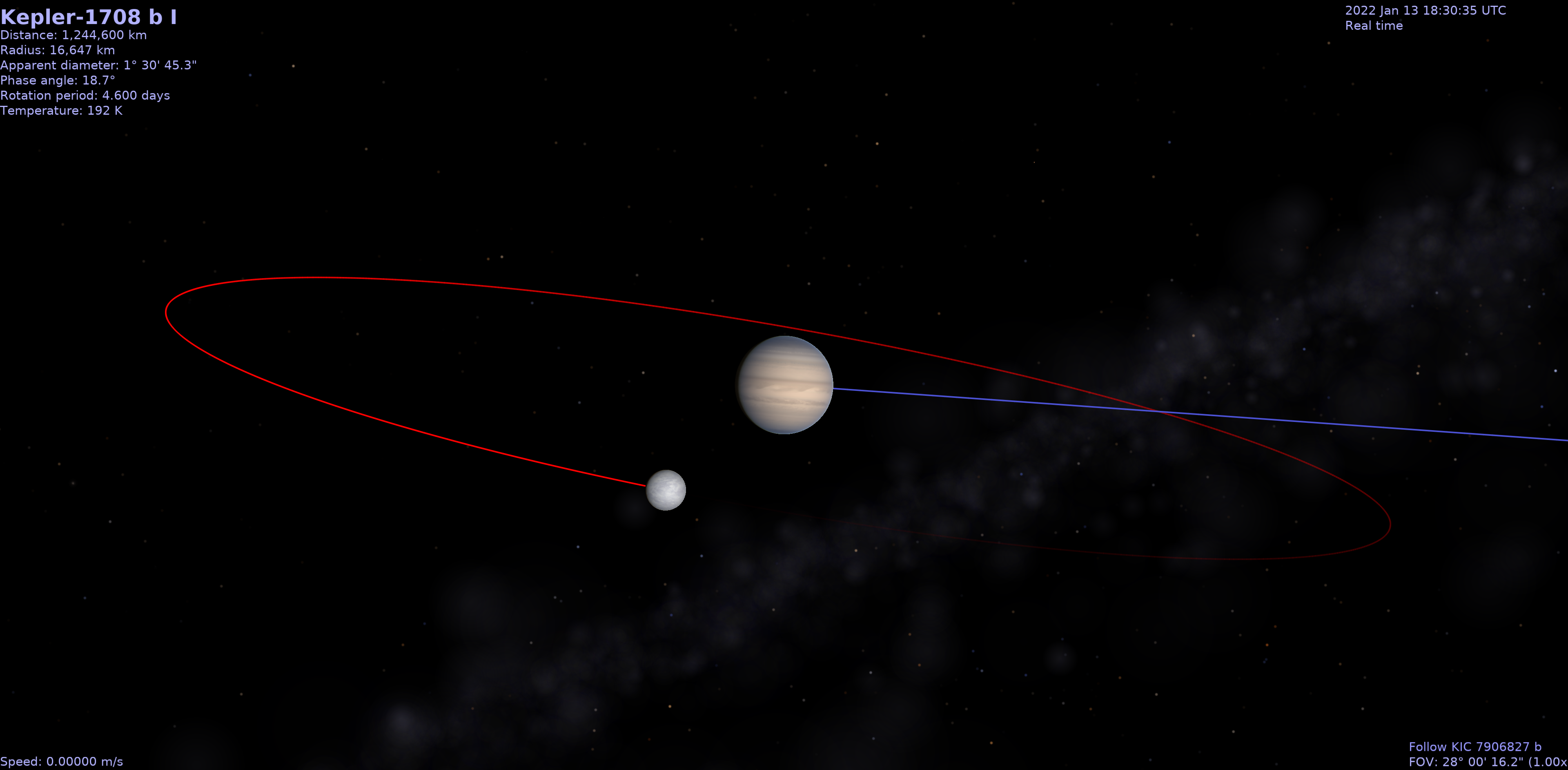
Kepler-1708b and its possible exomoon, rendered in Celestia.

In 2021, David Kipping and colleagues performed a search for exomoons around cool, long-period gas giant exoplanets using Kepler photometric data. Out of a sample of 70 exoplanets analyzed, only Kepler-1708b exhibited signs of an orbiting exomoon manifesting as faint, secondary transits accompanying the planet's transits. This possible exomoon, designated Kepler-1708b I, appears to measure below the size of Neptune at 2.6 times Earth's radius. It likely orbits coplanar to its host planet from a distance up to 12 planetary radii—comparable to the distance between Jupiter and its moon Europa, or twice the Earth–Moon distance. The extraordinarily large size of Kepler-1708b I is reminiscent of Kepler-1625b I, another Neptune-sized exomoon candidate previously reported by Kipping et al. in 2017.

Additional observations are necessary to confirm or refute the exomoon's existence—only two transits by Kepler-1708b and its possible exomoon have been observed, and no transit timing variations can be determined as of yet. Kipping et al. determine that the probability of detecting one false positive exomoon in the studied sample of 70 exoplanets was <50%. A follow-up study suggested Kepler-1708b I is likely undetectable with the Hubble Space Telescope, but the James Webb Space Telescope should be able to confirm or refute its existence.

In 2024, a paper was published disputing both 1625b I and 1708b I’s existences, but a reply to this paper refute most claims given, and conclude that the existence of an exomoon is likely but need additional observations.

== See also ==
- Kepler-1625b
- 2MASS J11193254–1137466 AB
- PDS 70
- V1400 Centauri
