= Systematics (disambiguation) =

In biology, systematics studies the diversity of organismal characteristics.

Systematics may also refer to:

== Other academic fields ==
- Systematics (systems science), the study of inherent properties of systems based on their number of terms
- Systematic theology, of Christian doctrine

== Other uses ==
- Systematic Paris-Region, a tech business cluster in Île-de-France
- Systematics, Inc, an American data processing company

== See also ==
- System (disambiguation)
- Systematic (disambiguation)
- Systemics
