= Kepler-1625b =

Gas giant orbiting Kepler-1625

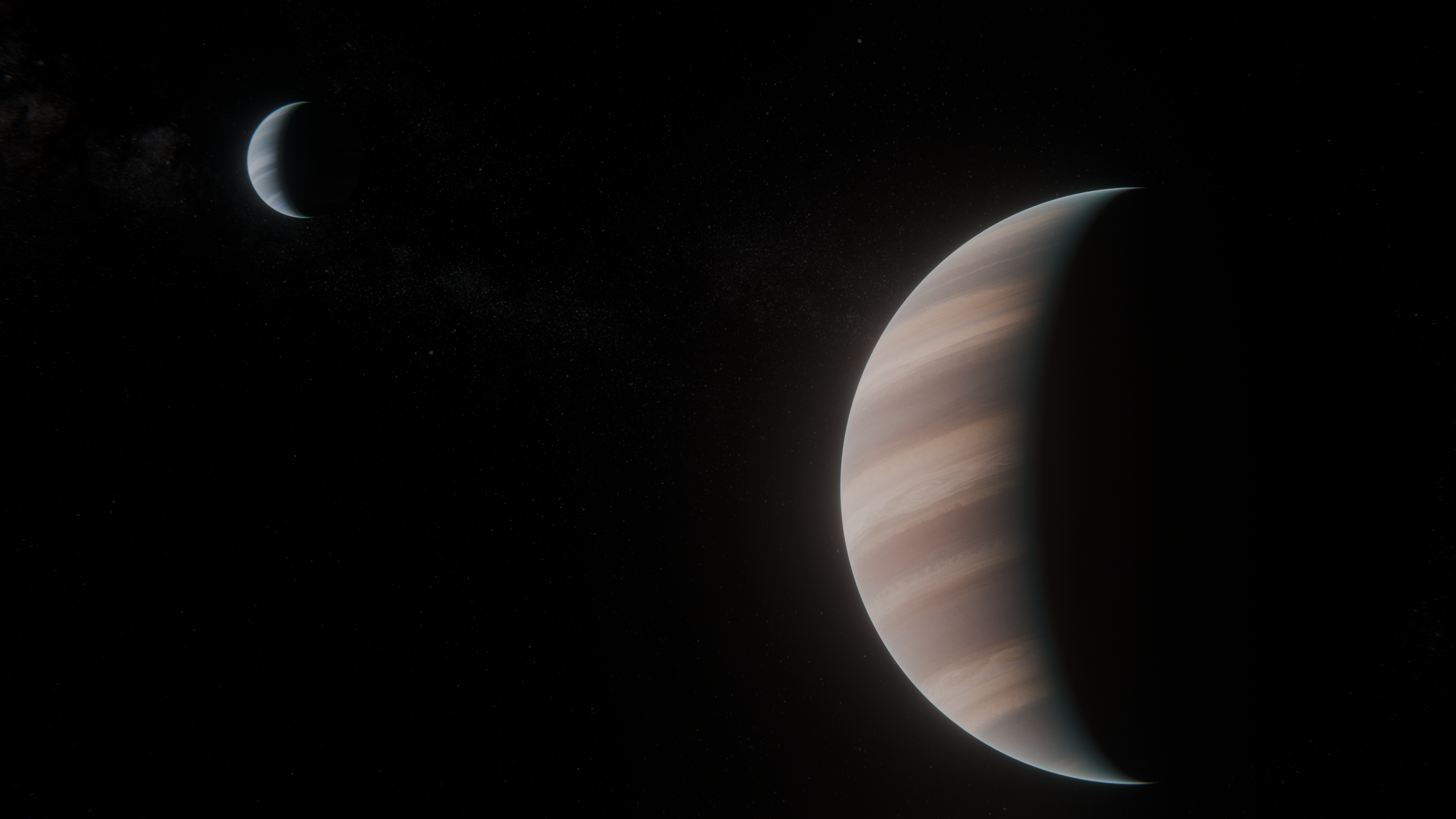
- Artist's impression of the exoplanet Kepler-1625b and its candidate exomoon Kepler-1625b I.

Discovery
- Discovery site: Kepler Space Observatory
- Discovery date: 10 May 2016
- Detection method: Transit (Kepler Mission)

Orbital characteristics
- Semi-major axis: 0.98 ± 0.14 AU
- Orbital period (sidereal): 287.378949 d
- Inclination: 89.97 ± 0.02
- Known satellites: Kepler-1625b I?
- Star: Kepler-1625

Physical characteristics
- Mean radius: 1.18+0.18 −0.32 R_{J}
- Mass: ≤11.60 M_{J}

Kepler-1625b is a super-Jupiter exoplanet orbiting the Sun-like star Kepler-1625 about 2,500 parsecs (8,200 light-years) away in the constellation of Cygnus. The large gas giant is approximately the same radius as Jupiter, and orbits its star every 287.4 days. In 2017, hints of a Neptune-sized exomoon in orbit of the planet were found using photometric observations collected by the Kepler Mission. Further evidence for a Neptunian moon was found the following year using the Hubble Space Telescope, where two independent lines of evidence constrained the mass and radius to be Neptune-like. The mass-signature has been independently recovered by two other teams. However, the radius-signature was independently recovered by one of the teams but not the other. The original discovery team later showed that this latter study appears affected by systematic error sources that may have influenced its findings.

== Characteristics ==
=== Mass and radius ===
Kepler-1625b is a Jovian-sized gas giant, a type of planet several times greater in radius than Earth and mostly composed of hydrogen and helium. It has been estimated to be 11.4±1.5 times Earth's radius, approximately equal to that of the planet Jupiter. Its mass is unknown, but is constrained at 3-sigma confidence to be less than 11.6 times the mass of Jupiter (about 3,700 Earth masses), based on non-detection in radial velocity observations. This indicates that it is below the deuterium-fusing limit, which is around 13 Jupiter masses, and so it is not a brown dwarf.

=== Orbit and temperature ===
Unlike the gas giants in our Solar System, Kepler-1625b orbits much closer, slightly closer than the orbital radius as the Earth around the Sun. The planet takes 287 days (0.786 years; 9.43 months) to orbit Kepler-1625, as a result of the star's slightly greater mass than the Sun. Kepler-1625b receives 2.6 times more insolation than the Earth, meaning it lies at the inner edge of the habitable zone. However, as the planet has likely no solid surface, bodies of liquid water are impossible.

== Candidate exomoon ==
Kepler-1625b I
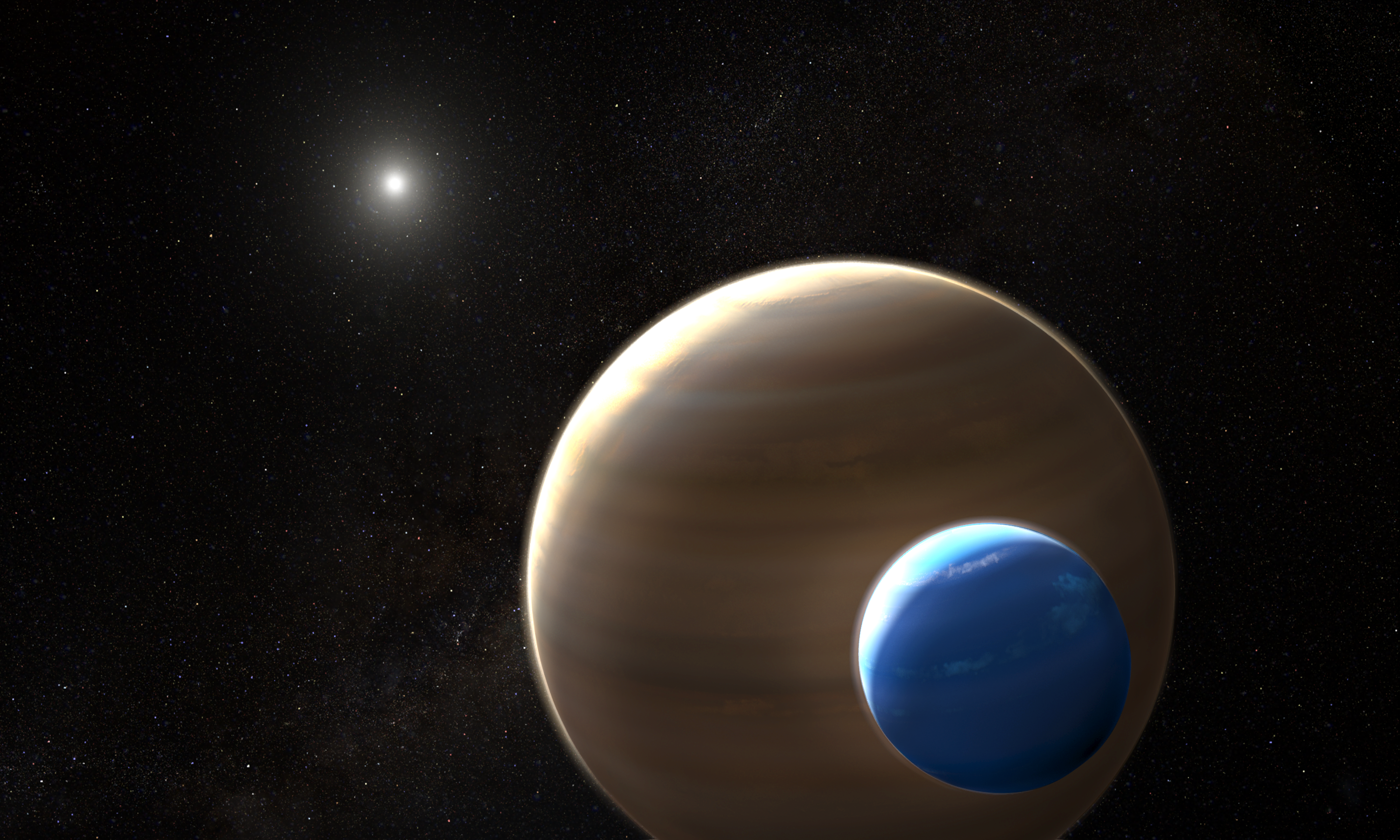
- Exomoon Kepler-1625b I orbiting exoplanet Kepler-1625b (artist concept).

Discovery
- Discovered by: Alex Teachey, David M. Kipping and Allan R. Schmitt
- Discovery date: 2017
- Detection method: Primary transit

Orbital characteristics
- Satellite of: Kepler-1625b

Physical characteristics
- Mean radius: 0.437 R_{J}
- Mass: 19.069 M_{🜨} 0.06 M_{J}
- Mean density: 0.95 g/cm^{3}

In July 2017, researchers found signs of a Neptune-sized exomoon (a moon in another solar system) orbiting Kepler-1625b using archival Kepler Mission data.

In October 2018, researchers using the Hubble Space Telescope published new observations of the star Kepler-1625, conducted in October 2017, which revealed two independent lines of evidence indicative of a large exomoon Kepler-1625b I. These were a 20-minute Transit Timing Variation signature that indicated an approximately Neptune-mass moon, and an additional photometric dip that indicated a Neptune-radius moon. The relative phasing of the two signatures was also consistent with that which a real moon would cause, with the effects in anti-phase. The study concluded that the exomoon hypothesis is the simplest and best explanation for the available observations, though warned that it is difficult to assign a precise probability to its reality and urged follow-up analyses. Like several moons in the Solar System, the large exomoon would theoretically be able to host its own moon, called a subsatellite, in a stable orbit, although no evidence for such a subsatellite has been found.

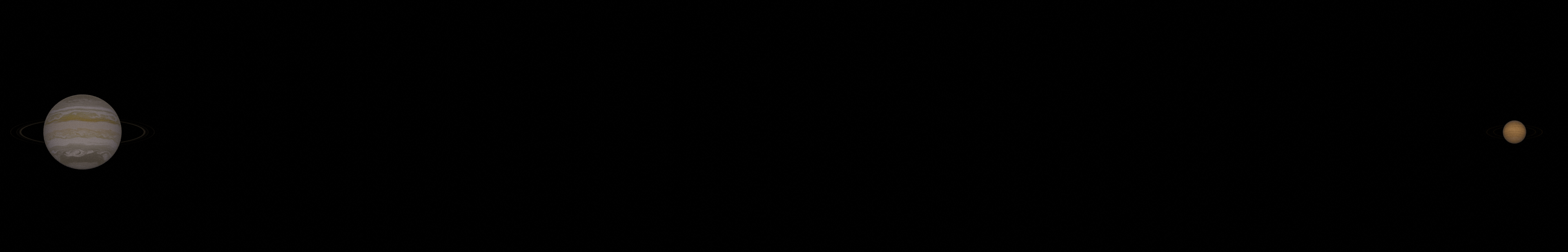
Kepler-1625b I (on the right) would be located more than 3,000,000 km from Kepler-1625b (on the left), estimated using time deviations from the transit method (approximately 8 times the distance between the Earth and the Moon). The objects are to scale (based on transit data) while the colors of the planets are based on speculative averages of data on the composition of nearby stars/clouds and photolysis, although these keep being speculative.

In February 2019, an independent reanalysis of the combined Kepler and Hubble observations recovered both a moon-like dip and similar transit timing variation signal. However, the authors suggested that the data could also be explained by an inclined hot-Jupiter in the same system that has gone previously undetected, which could be tested using future Doppler spectroscopy radial velocity measurements. A second independent reanalysis was published in April 2019, which recovered one of the two lines of evidence, the transit timing variation, but the not the second, the moon-like dip. The original discovery team responded to this soon after, finding that this re-analysis exhibits stronger systematics in their reduction which may be responsible for their differing conclusion.

== See also ==
- Kepler-1708b
- PDS 70
- 2MASS J11193254–1137466 AB
- V1400 Centauri
