= Exomoon =

Moon beyond the Solar System

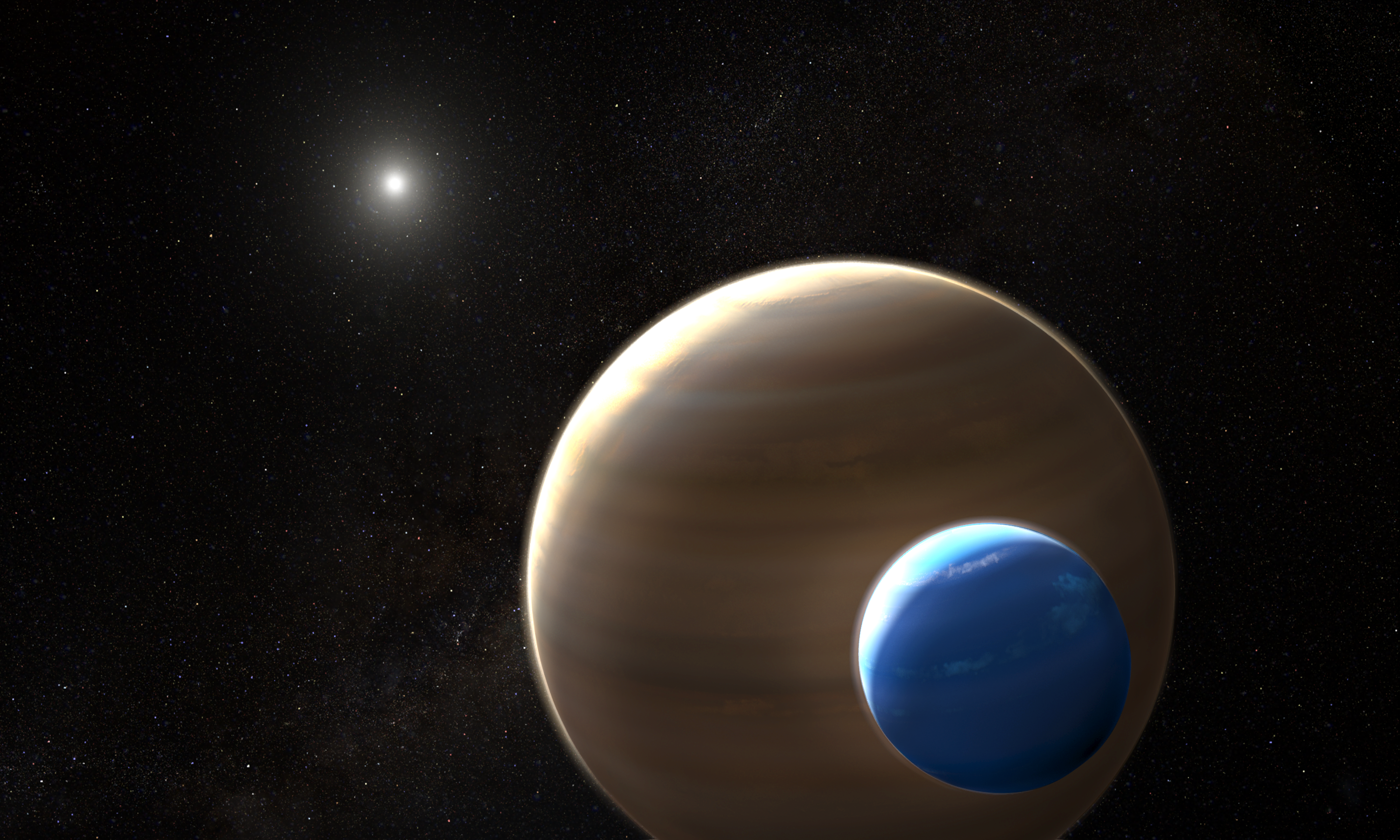
Artist's impression of candidate exomoon Kepler-1625b I orbiting its planet.

An exomoon or extrasolar moon is a natural satellite that orbits an exoplanet or other non-stellar extrasolar body.

Exomoons are difficult to detect and confirm using current techniques, and to date there have been no confirmed exomoon detections. However, observations from missions such as Kepler have observed a number of candidates. Two potential exomoons that may orbit rogue planets have also been detected by microlensing. In September 2019, astronomers reported that the observed dimmings of Tabby's Star may have been produced by fragments resulting from the disruption of an orphaned exomoon. Some exomoons may be potential habitats for extraterrestrial life. A possible exomoon, which, if real, may be habitable, has been discovered around one of the components of the binary rogue planet 2MASS J11193254−1137466 AB.

== Definition and designation ==
Although traditional usage implies moons orbit a planet, the discovery of brown dwarfs with planet-sized satellites blurs the distinction between planets and moons, due to the low mass of brown dwarfs. This confusion is resolved by the International Astronomical Union (IAU) declaration that "Objects with true masses below the limiting mass for thermonuclear fusion of deuterium that orbit stars, brown dwarfs or stellar remnants and that have a mass ratio with the central object below the L4/L5 instability (M/M_{central} < 2/(25+√621)) are planets."

The IAU definition does not address the naming convention for the satellites of free-floating objects that are less massive than brown dwarfs and below the deuterium limit (the objects are typically referred to as free-floating planets, rogue planets, low-mass brown dwarfs or isolated planetary-mass objects). The satellites of these objects are typically referred to as exomoons in the literature.

Exomoons take their designation from that of their parent body plus a capital Roman numeral in order of discovery; for example, the candidate moon of Kepler-1625b is designated as Kepler-1625b I.

== Characteristics ==
The characteristics of extrasolar satellites are expected to vary widely, in a manner similar to the diversity observed among the Solar System's moons. In particular, extrasolar giant planets that orbit within their star's habitable zone may host large natural satellites. Under favorable conditions, a sufficiently massive satellite potentially comparable in size to a terrestrial planet could retain an atmosphere and liquid water, making it a possible candidate for supporting life.

In August 2019, astronomers reported that an exomoon in the WASP-49b exoplanet system may be volcanically active.

== Orbital inclination ==
For impact-generated moons of terrestrial planets not too far from their star, with a large planet–moon distance, it is expected that the orbital planes of moons will tend to be aligned with the planet's orbit around the star due to tides from the star, but if the planet–moon distance is small it may be inclined. For gas giants, the orbits of moons will tend to be aligned with the giant planet's equator because these formed in circumplanetary disks.

== Lack of moons around planets close to their stars ==
Planets close to their stars on circular orbits will tend to despin and become tidally locked. As the planet's rotation slows down the radius of a synchronous orbit of the planet moves outwards from the planet. For planets tidally locked to their stars, the distance from the planet at which the moon will be in a synchronous orbit around the planet is outside the Hill sphere of the planet. The Hill sphere of the planet is the region where its gravity dominates that of the star so it can hold on to its moons. Moons inside the synchronous orbit radius of a planet will spiral into the planet. Therefore, if the synchronous orbit is outside the Hill sphere, then all moons will spiral into the planet. If the synchronous orbit is not three-body stable then moons outside this radius will escape orbit before they reach the synchronous orbit.

A study on tidal-induced migration offered a feasible explanation for this lack of exomoons. It showed the physical evolution of host planets (i.e. interior structure and size) plays a major role in their final fate: synchronous orbits can become transient states and moons are prone to be stalled in semi-asymptotic semimajor axes, or even ejected from the system, where other effects can appear. In turn, this would have a great impact on the detection of extrasolar satellites.

== Detection methods ==
The existence of exomoons around many exoplanets is theorized. Despite the great successes of planet hunters with Doppler spectroscopy of the host star, exomoons cannot be found with this technique. This is because the resultant shifted stellar spectra due to the presence of a planet plus additional satellites would behave identically to a single point-mass moving in orbit of the host star. In recognition of this, there have been several other methods proposed for detecting exomoons, including:

- Direct imaging
- Microlensing
- Pulsar timing
- Transit timing effects
- Transit method

=== Direct imaging ===
Direct imaging of an exoplanet is extremely challenging due to the large difference in brightness between the star and exoplanet as well as the small size and irradiance of the planet. These problems are greater for exomoons in most cases. However, it has been theorized that tidally heated exomoons could shine as brightly as some exoplanets. Tidal forces can heat up an exomoon because energy is dissipated by differential forces on it. Io, a tidally heated moon orbiting Jupiter, has volcanoes powered by tidal forces. If a tidally heated exomoon is sufficiently tidally heated and is distant enough from its star for the moon's light not to be drowned out, it would be possible for a telescope such as the James Webb Space Telescope to image it.

=== Doppler spectroscopy of host planet ===
Doppler spectroscopy is an indirect detection method that measures the velocity shift and resulting stellar spectrum shift associated with an orbiting planet. This method is also known as the Radial Velocity method. It is most successful for main sequence stars. The spectra of exoplanets have been successfully partially retrieved for several cases, including HD 189733 b and HD 209458 b. The quality of the retrieved spectra is significantly more affected by noise than the stellar spectrum. As a result, the spectral resolution, and number of retrieved spectral features, is much lower than the level required to perform Doppler spectroscopy of the exoplanet.

=== Radio wave emissions from the host planet's magnetosphere ===
During its orbit, Io's ionosphere interacts with Jupiter's magnetosphere, to create a frictional current that causes radio wave emissions. These are called "Io-controlled decametric emissions" and the researchers believe finding similar emissions near known exoplanets could be key to predicting where other moons exist.

=== Microlensing ===
In 2002, Cheongho Han & Wonyong Han proposed microlensing be used to detect exomoons. The authors found detecting satellite signals in lensing light curves will be very difficult because the signals are seriously smeared out by the severe finite-source effect even for events involved with source stars with small angular radii.

=== Pulsar timing ===
In 2008, Lewis, Sackett, and Mardling of the Monash University, Australia, proposed using pulsar timing to detect the moons of pulsar planets. The authors applied their method to the case of PSR B1620-26 b and found that a stable moon orbiting this planet could be detected, if the moon had a separation of about one-fiftieth of that of the orbit of the planet around the pulsar and a mass ratio to the planet of 5% or larger.

=== Transit timing effects ===
In 2007, physicists A. Simon, K. Szatmáry, and Gy. M. Szabó published a research note titled 'Determination of the size, mass, and density of "exomoons" from photometric transit timing variations'.

In 2009, David Kipping published a paper outlining how by combining multiple observations of variations in the time of mid-transit (TTV, caused by the planet leading or trailing the planet–moon system's barycenter when the pair are oriented roughly perpendicular to the line of sight) with variations of the transit duration (TDV, caused by the planet moving along the direction path of transit relative to the planet–moon system's barycenter when the moon–planet axis lies roughly along the line of sight) a unique exomoon signature is produced. Furthermore, the work demonstrated how both the mass of the exomoon and its orbital distance from the planet could be determined using the two effects.

In a later study, Kipping concluded that habitable zone exomoons could be detected by the Kepler Space Telescope using the TTV and TDV effects.

=== Transit method (star-planet-moon systems) ===
When an exoplanet passes in front of the host star, a small dip in the light received from the star may be observed. The transit method is currently the most successful and responsive method for detecting exoplanets. This effect, also known as occultation, is proportional to the square of the planet's radius. If a planet and a moon pass in front of a host star, both objects should produce a dip in the observed light. A planet–moon eclipse may also occur during the transit, but such events have an inherently low probability.

=== Transit method (planet–moon systems) ===
If the host planet is directly imaged, then transits of an exomoon may be observable. When an exomoon passes in front of the host planet, a small dip in the light received from the directly imaged planet may be detected. Exomoons of directly imaged exoplanets and free-floating planets are predicted to have a high transit probability and occurrence rate. Moons as small as Io or Titan should be detectable with the James Webb Space Telescope using this method, but this search method requires a substantial amount of observation time. One attempted transit-based search for moons of Kepler-167e in 2025 was inconclusive, with observations possibly better explained by the planet passing in front of a starspot.

=== Orbital sampling effects ===
If a glass bottle is held up to the light it is easier to see through the middle of the glass than it is near the edges. Similarly, a sequence of samples of a moon's position will be more bunched up at the edges of the moon's orbit of a planet than in the middle. If a moon orbits a planet that transits its star then the moon will also transit the star and this bunching up at the edges may be detectable in the transit light curves if a sufficient number of measurements are made. The larger the star the greater the number of measurements needed to create observable bunching. The Kepler telescope data may contain enough data to detect moons around red dwarfs using orbital sampling effects but won't have enough data for Sun-like stars.

=== Indirect detection around hot Jupiters ===
By analogy to the Io moon of Jupiter, it is theorized that tidally heated exomoons around hot Jupiters are covered in a distinct envelope of sodium or potassium which can be detected using ground-based spectrographs and may indicate the existence of these exomoons.

=== Indirect detection around white dwarfs ===
The atmosphere of white dwarfs can be polluted with metals and in a few cases, the white dwarfs are surrounded by a debris disk. Usually, this pollution is caused by asteroids or comets, but tidally disrupted exomoons were also proposed in the past as a source of white dwarf pollution. In 2021 Klein and collaborators discovered that the white dwarfs GD 378 and GALEXJ2339 had an unusually high pollution with beryllium. The researchers conclude that oxygen, carbon or nitrogen atoms must have been subjected to MeV collisions with protons in order to create this excess of beryllium. In one proposed scenario, the beryllium excess is caused by a tidally disrupted exomoon. In this scenario a moon-forming icy disk exists around a giant planet, which orbits the white dwarf. The strong magnetic field of such a giant planet accelerates stellar wind particles, such as protons, and directs them into the disk. The accelerated proton collides with water ice in the disk, creating elements like beryllium, boron, and lithium in a spallation reaction. These three elements are relatively rare in the universe as they are destroyed in the process of stellar fusion. A moonlet forming in this kind of disk would have a higher beryllium, boron and lithium abundance. The study also predicted that the mid-sized moons of Saturn, for example, Mimas, should be enriched in Be, B, and Li.

=== Indirect detection around brown dwarfs ===
In July 2026, astronomers announced that radial-velocity monitoring of CD-35 2722B with the ESO's Very Large Telescope provided strong evidence for at least one planetary-mass satellite. It is uncertain whether this exosatellite would fulfill the presently undefined criteria for qualifying as an exomoon, given that CD-35 2722B is likely to be a brown dwarf based on its mass, and the exosatellite is massive enough to be a planet.

== Candidates ==
There are a few exomoon candidates that have been reported through various methods. For example, the exomoon candidates of Kepler-1625b and Kepler-1708b have been reported through secondary transits and transit-timing variations. The exomoon candidates of WASP-12 b and WASP-49 Ab have been reported based on spectroscopic detections of unusually high concentrations of sodium, which could potentially come from a volcanically active moon resembling Io.

== Detection projects ==
There are several missions underway now using some of the methods described above, which will find many more candidate exomoons and be able to confirm or disprove some candidates. PLATO, for example, is expected to launch in early 2027.

As part of the Kepler mission, the Hunt for Exomoons with Kepler (HEK) project was intended to detect exomoons, and generated some of the candidates still discussed today.

== Habitability ==
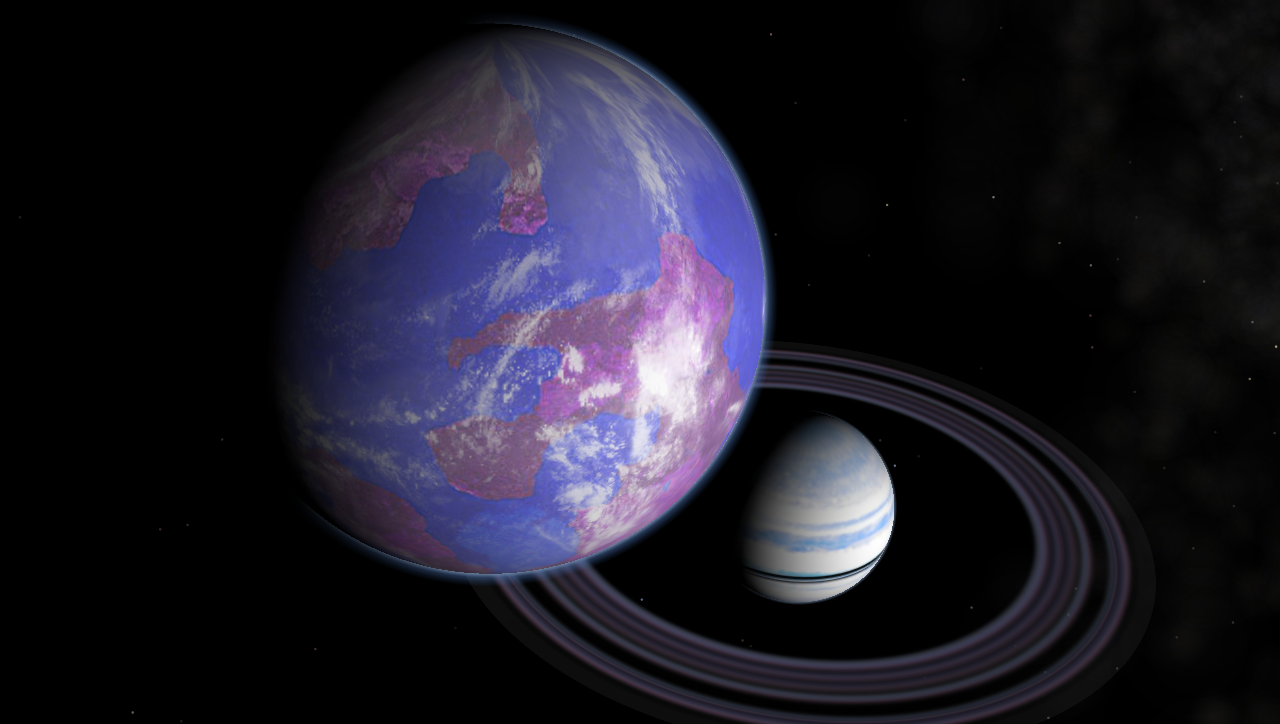
Artist's impression of a hypothetical Earth-like moon around a Saturn-like exoplanet

The habitability of exomoons has been considered in at least two studies published in peer-reviewed journals. René Heller & Rory Barnes considered stellar and planetary illumination on moons as well as the effect of eclipses on their orbit-averaged surface illumination. They also considered tidal heating as a threat to their habitability. In Section 4 in their paper, they introduce a new concept to define the habitable orbits of moons. Referring to the concept of the circumstellar Habitable zone for planets, they define an inner border for a moon to be habitable around a certain planet and call it the circumplanetary "habitable edge". Moons closer to their planet than the habitable edge are uninhabitable. In a second study, René Heller then included the effect of eclipses into this concept as well as constraints from a satellite's orbital stability. He found that, depending on a moon's orbital eccentricity, there is a minimum mass for stars to host habitable moons at around 0.2 solar masses.

Taking as an example the smaller Europa, at less than 1% the mass of the Earth, Lehmer et al. found if it were to end up near to Earth orbit it would only be able to hold onto its atmosphere for a few million years. However, for any larger, Ganymede-sized moons venturing into its solar system's habitable zone, an atmosphere and surface water could be retained indefinitely. Models for moon formation suggest the formation of even more massive moons than Ganymede is common around many of the super-Jovian exoplanets.

Earth-sized exoplanets in the habitable zone around M-dwarfs are often tidally locked to the host star. This has the effect that one hemisphere always faces the star, while the other remains in darkness. An exomoon in an M-dwarf system does not face this challenge, as it is tidally locked to the planet and it would receive light for both hemispheres. Martínez-Rodríguez et al. studied the possibility of exomoons around planets that orbit M-dwarfs in the habitable zone. While they found 33 exoplanets from earlier studies that lie in the habitable zone, only four could host Moon- to Titan-mass exomoons for timescales longer than 0.8 Gyr (HIP 12961 b, HIP 57050 b, Gliese 876 b and c). For this mass range the exomoons could probably not hold onto their atmosphere. The researchers increased the mass for the exomoons and found that exomoons with the mass of Mars around IL Aquarii b and c could be stable on timescales above the Hubble time. The CHEOPS mission could detect exomoons around the brightest M-dwarfs or ESPRESSO could detect the Rossiter–McLaughlin effect caused by the exomoons. Both methods require a transiting exoplanet, which is not the case for these four candidates.

Like an exoplanet, an exomoon can potentially become tidally locked to its primary. However, since the exomoon's primary is an exoplanet, it would continue to rotate relative to its star after becoming tidally locked, and thus would still experience a day/night cycle indefinitely.

The possible exomoon candidate transiting 2MASS J1119-1137AB lies in the habitable zone of its host (at least initially until the planet cools), but it is unlikely complex life has formed as the system is only 10 Myr old. If confirmed, the exomoon may be similar to primordial Earth and characterization of its atmosphere with the James Webb Space Telescope could perhaps place limits on the time scale for the formation of life.

== See also ==
- Exocomet – Comet outside the Solar System
- Kepler-46 – Old star with a planetary system
- Minor-planet moon, also known as Asteroid moon – Natural satellite of a minor planet
- Natural satellites of the Solar System – Astronomical body that orbits a planet
- Tidally detached exomoon – Planet that was formerly a moon of another planet
