= Lists of astronomical objects =

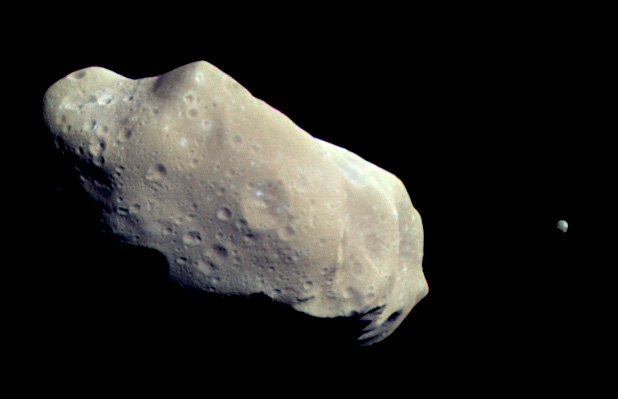
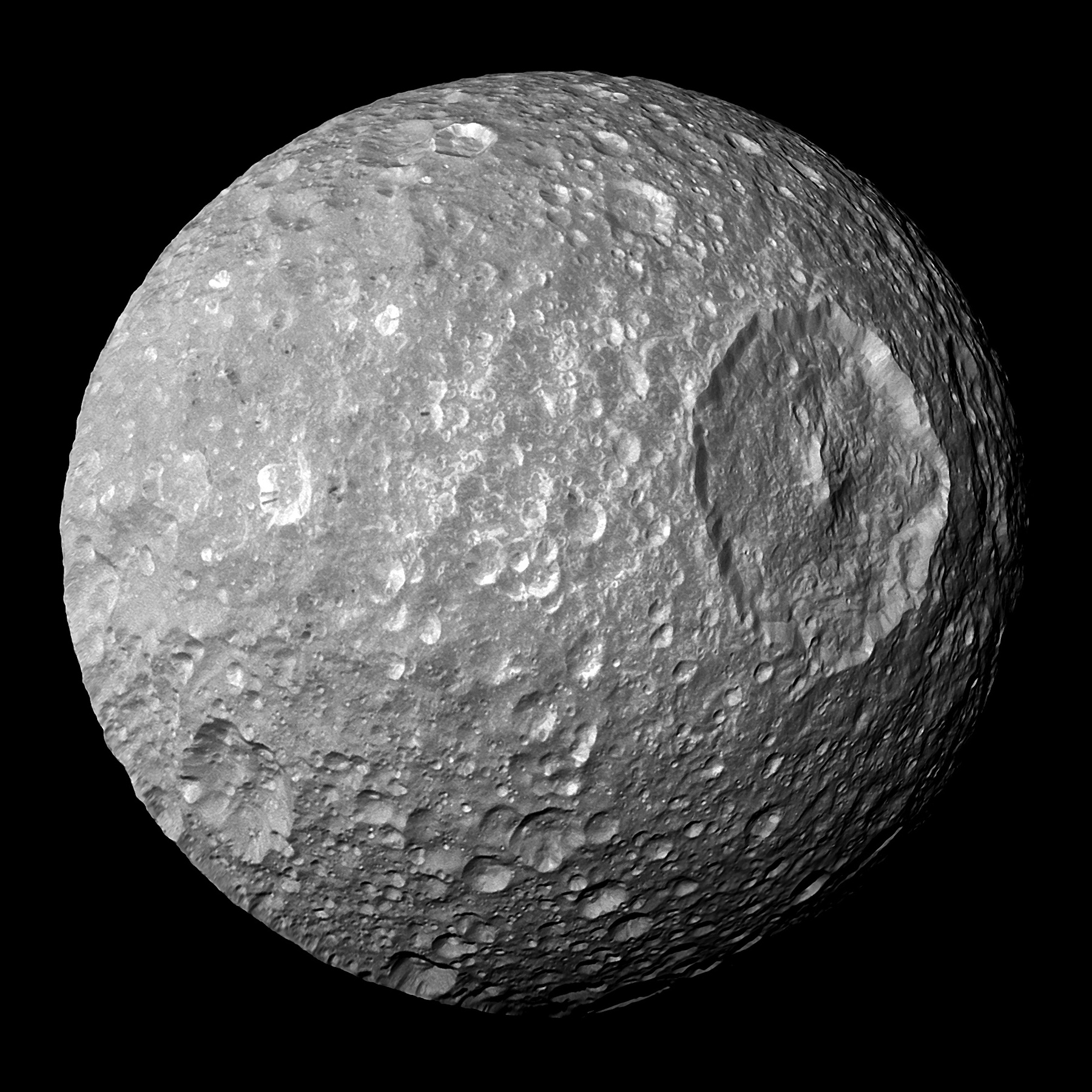
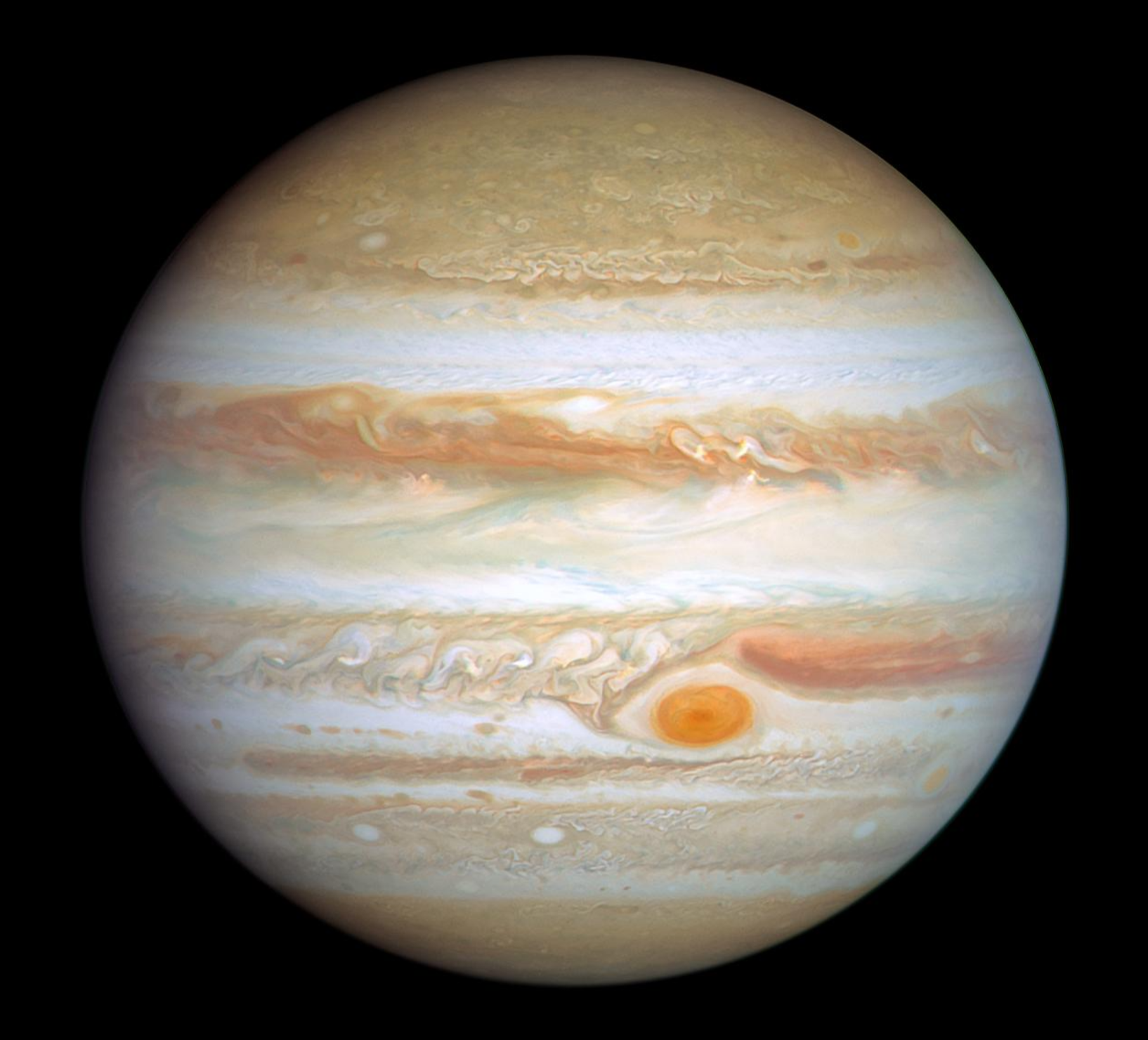
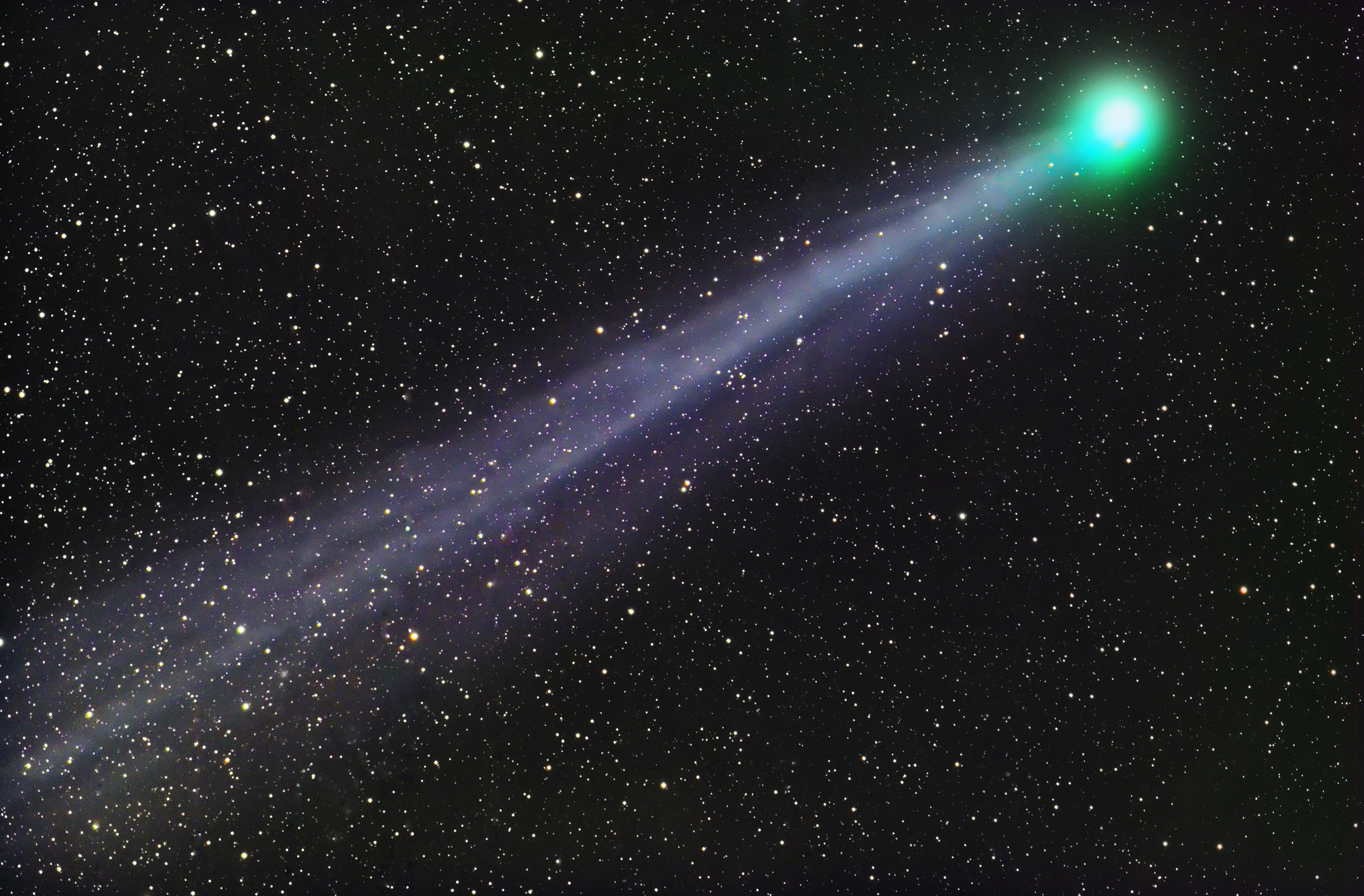
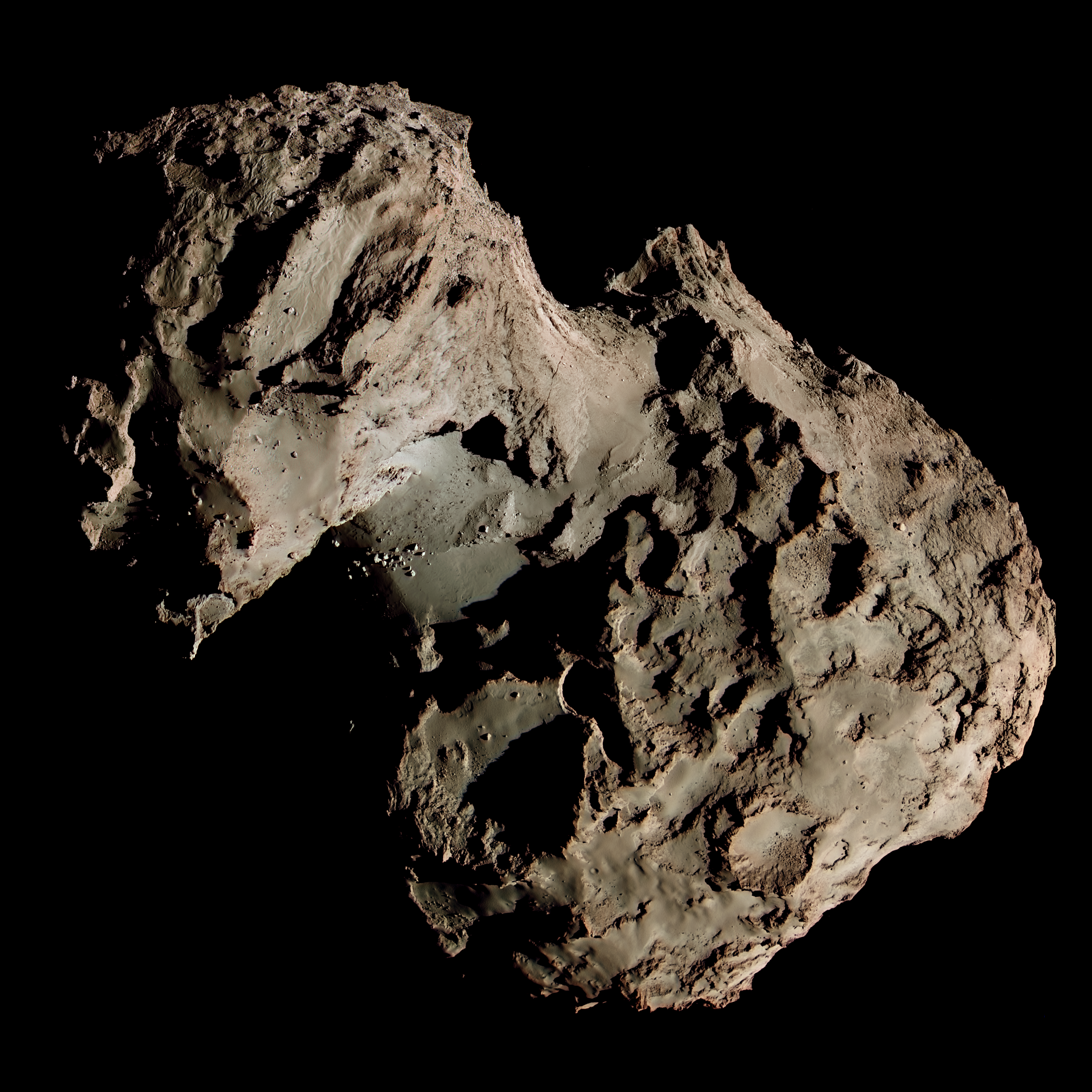
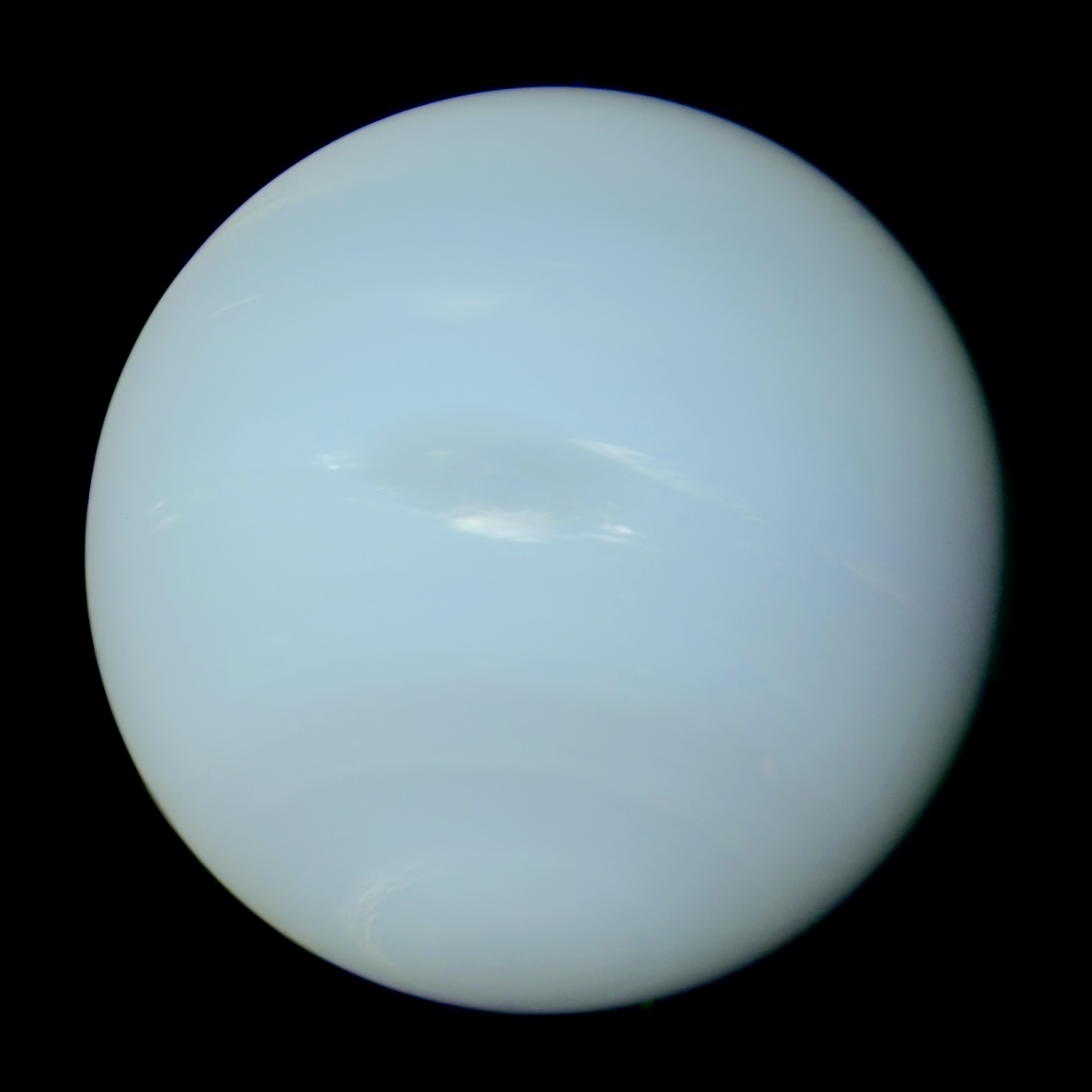
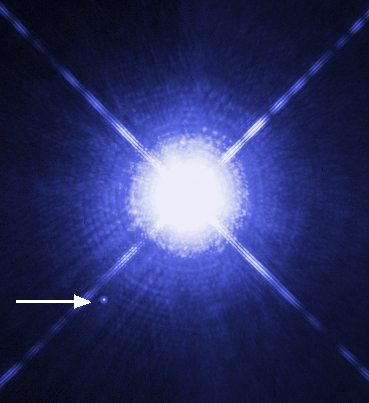
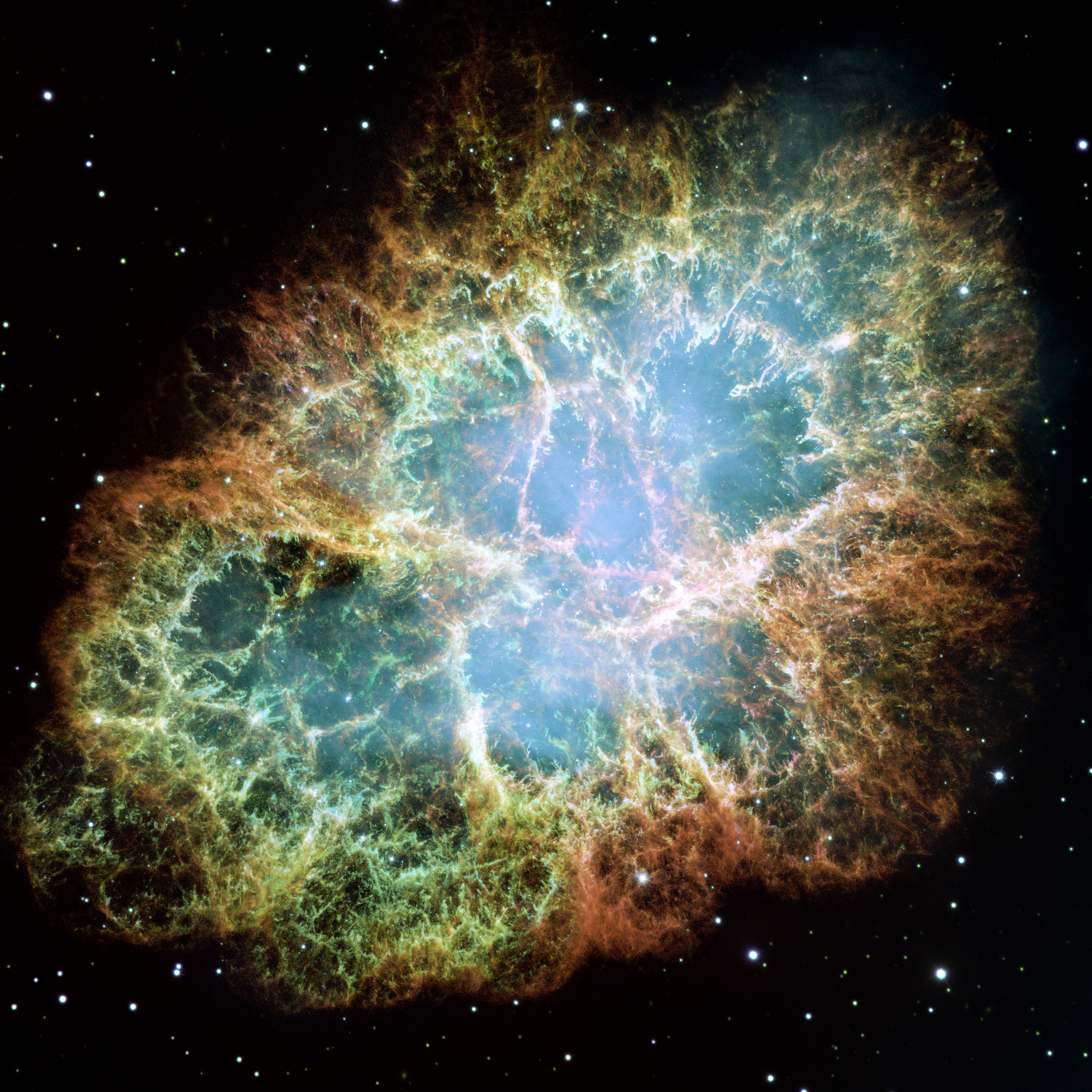
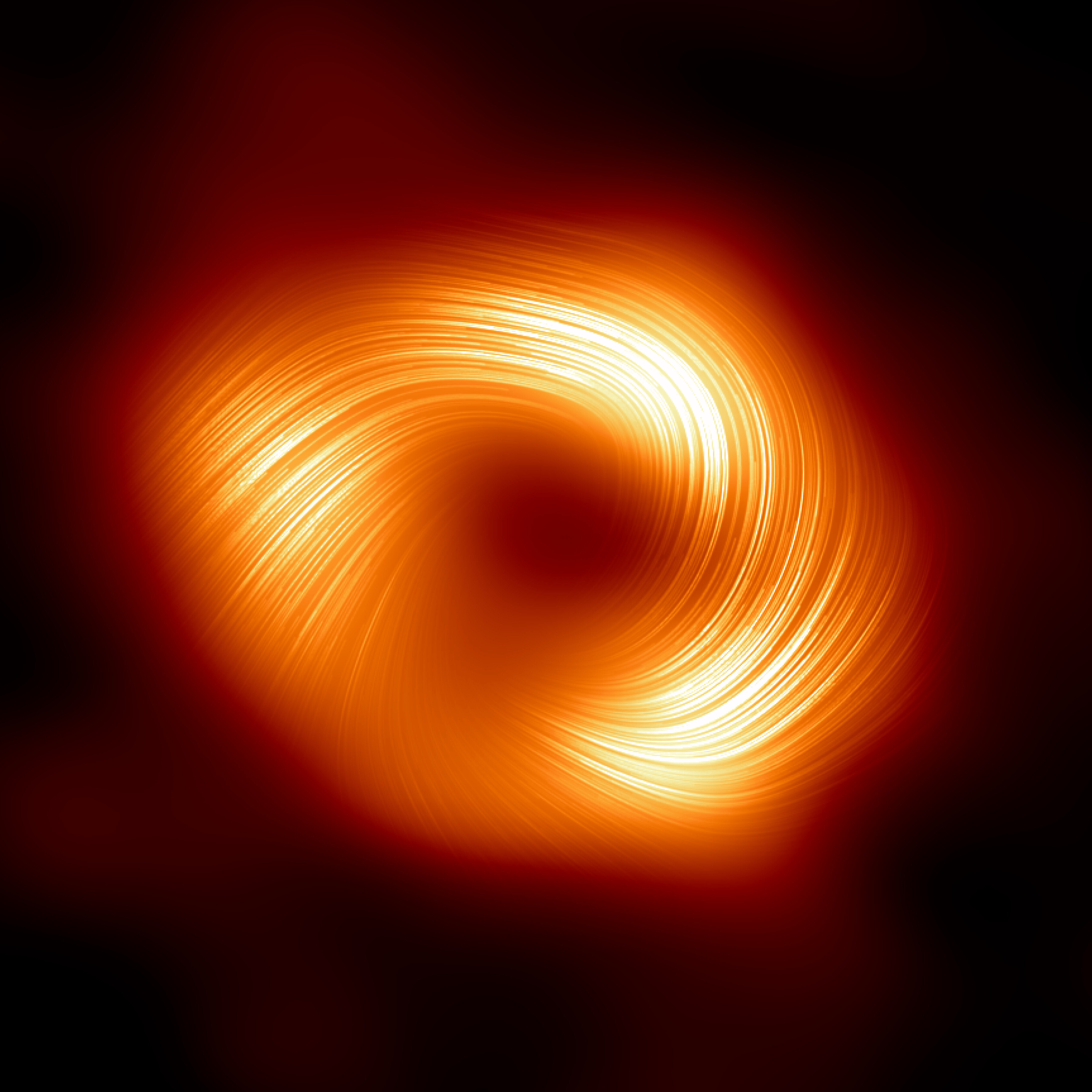
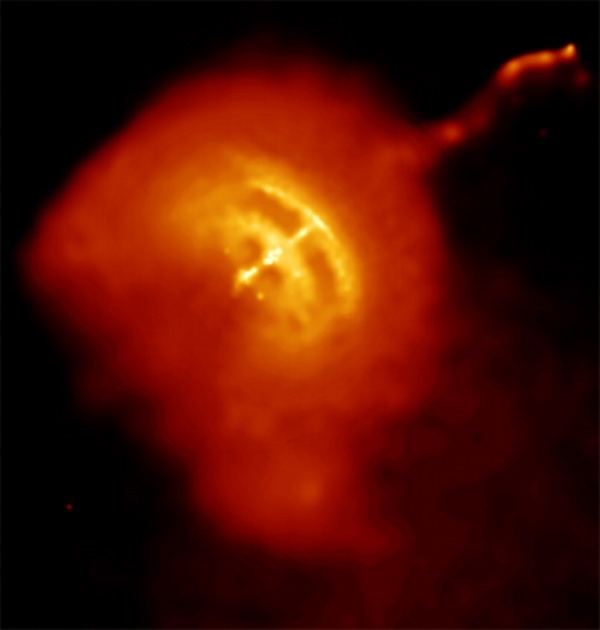
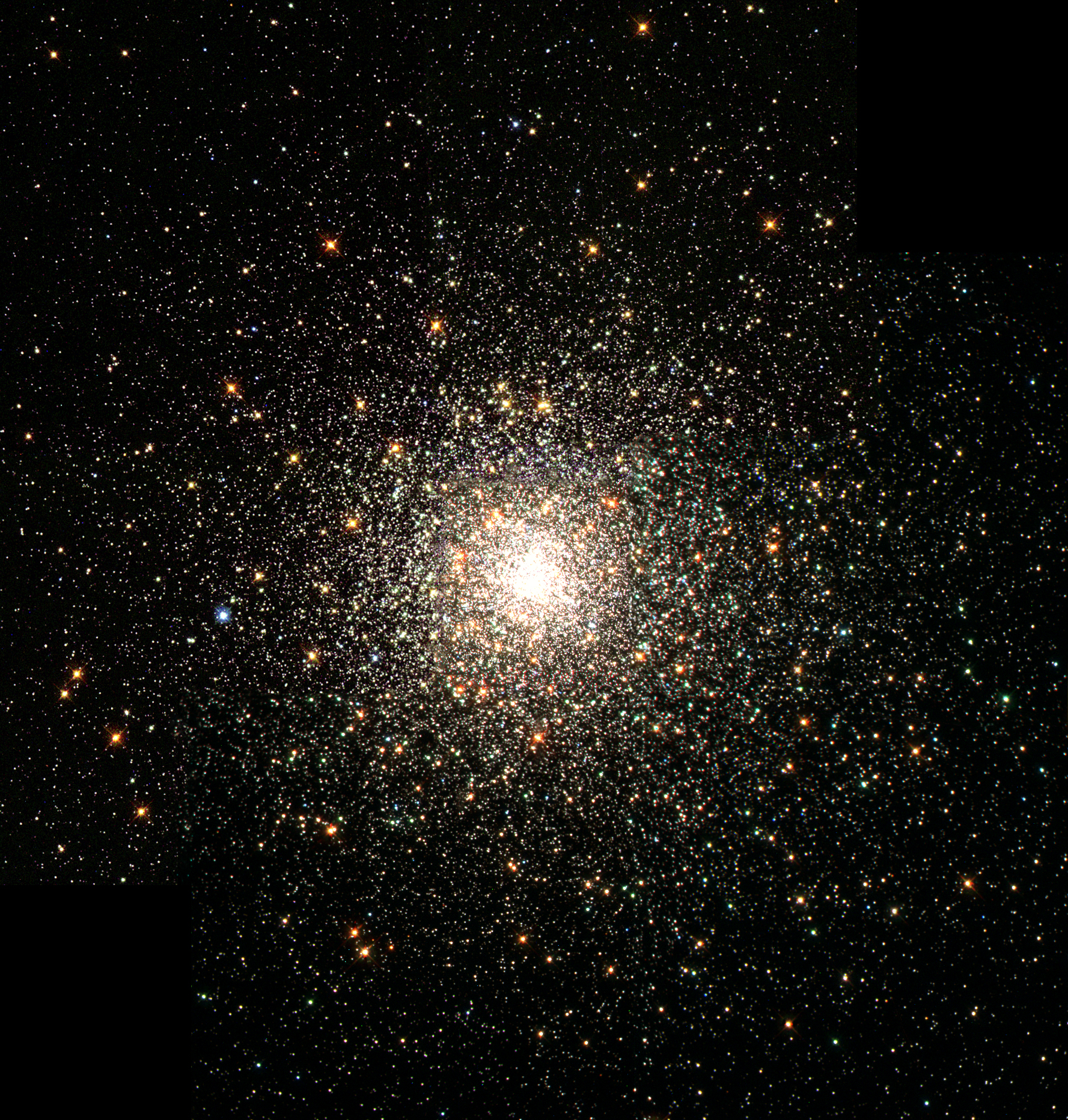
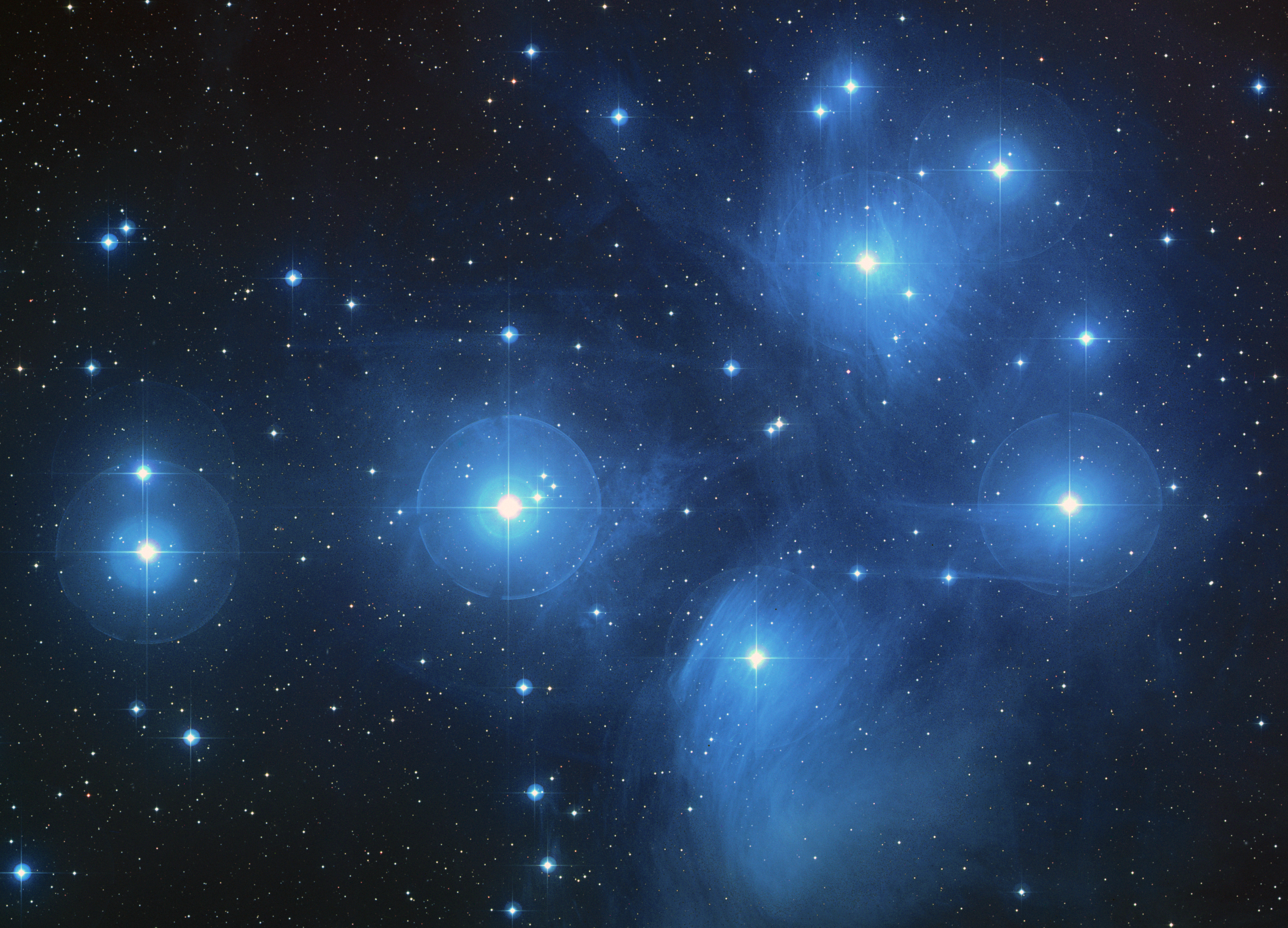
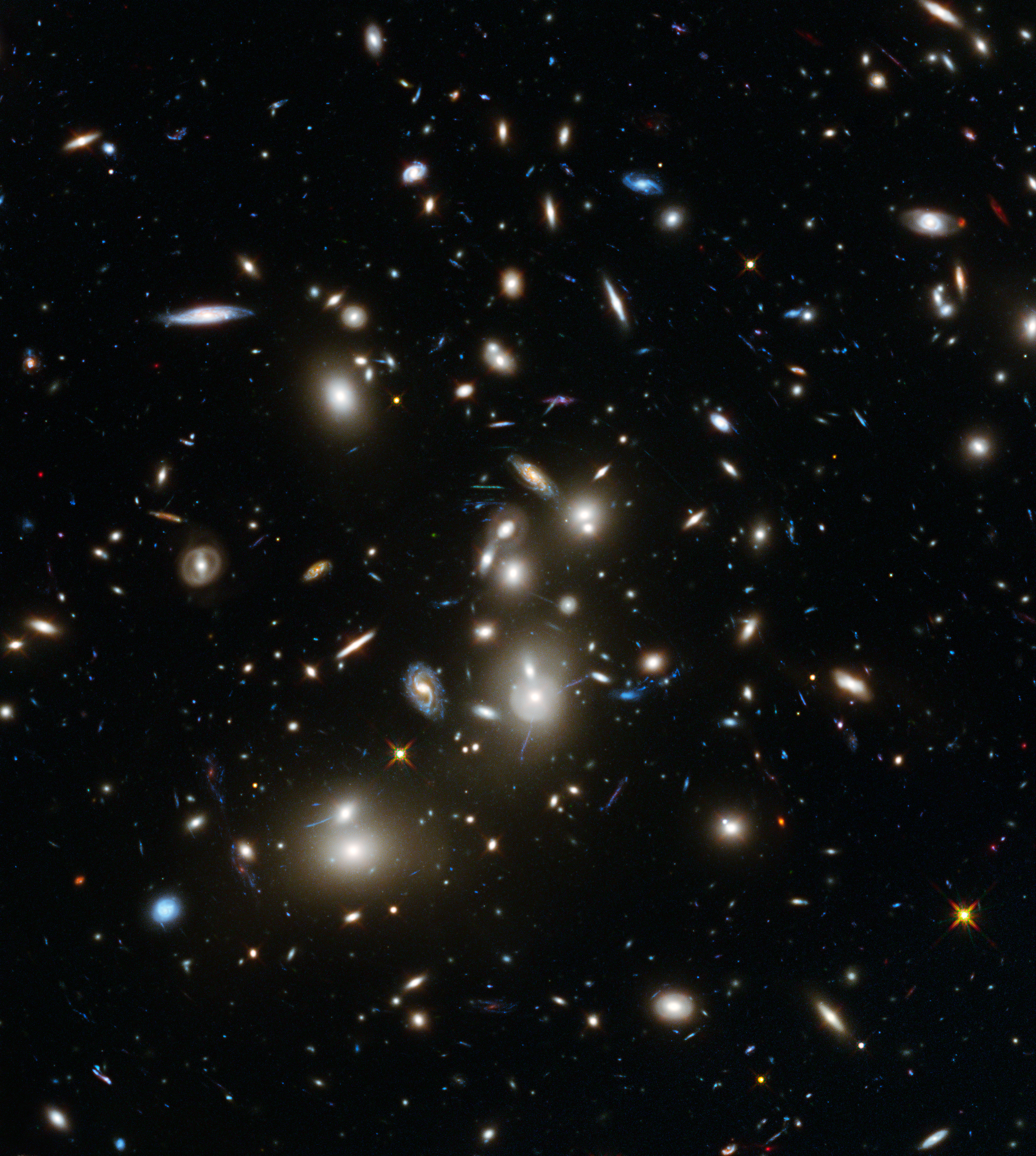
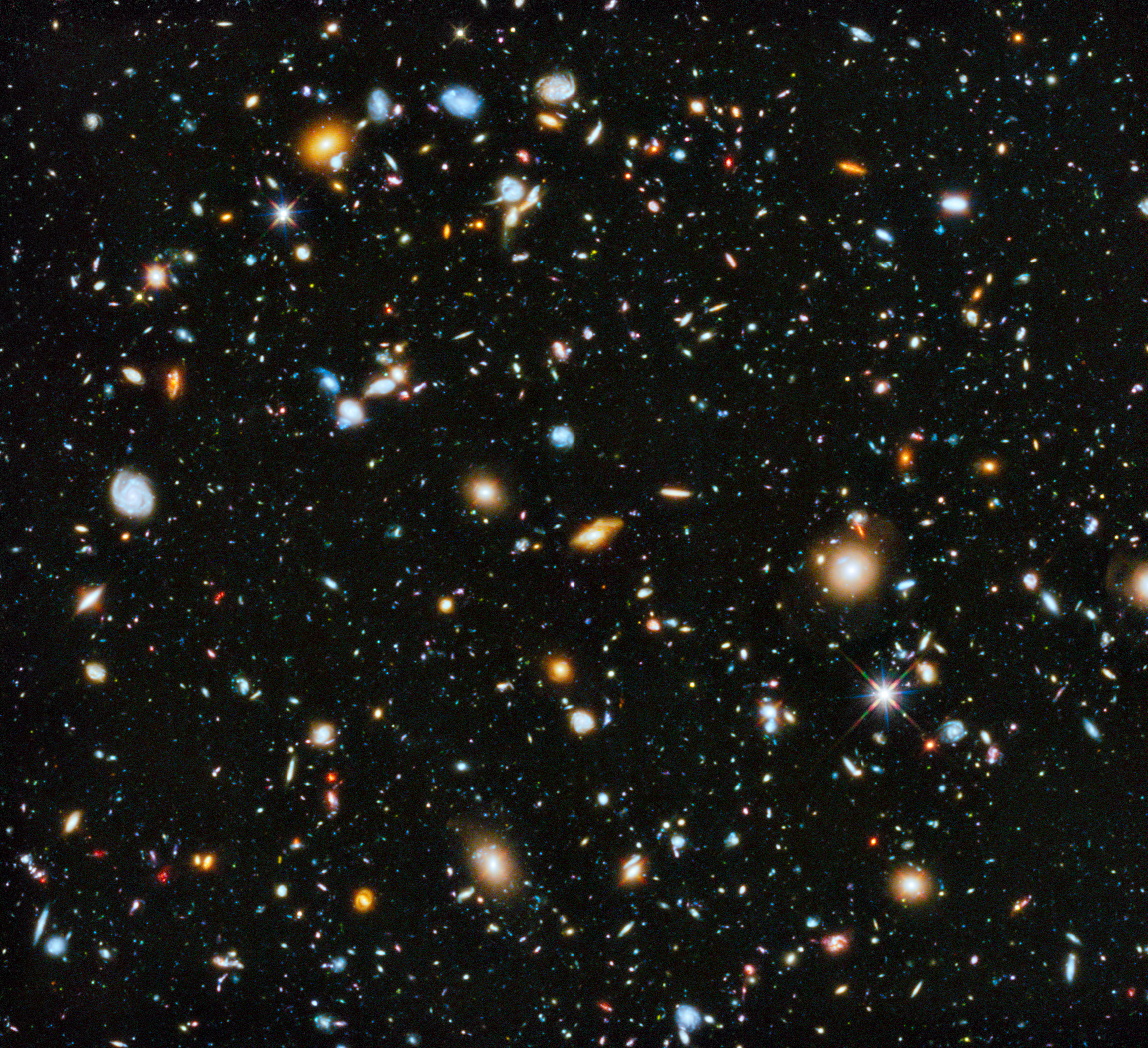
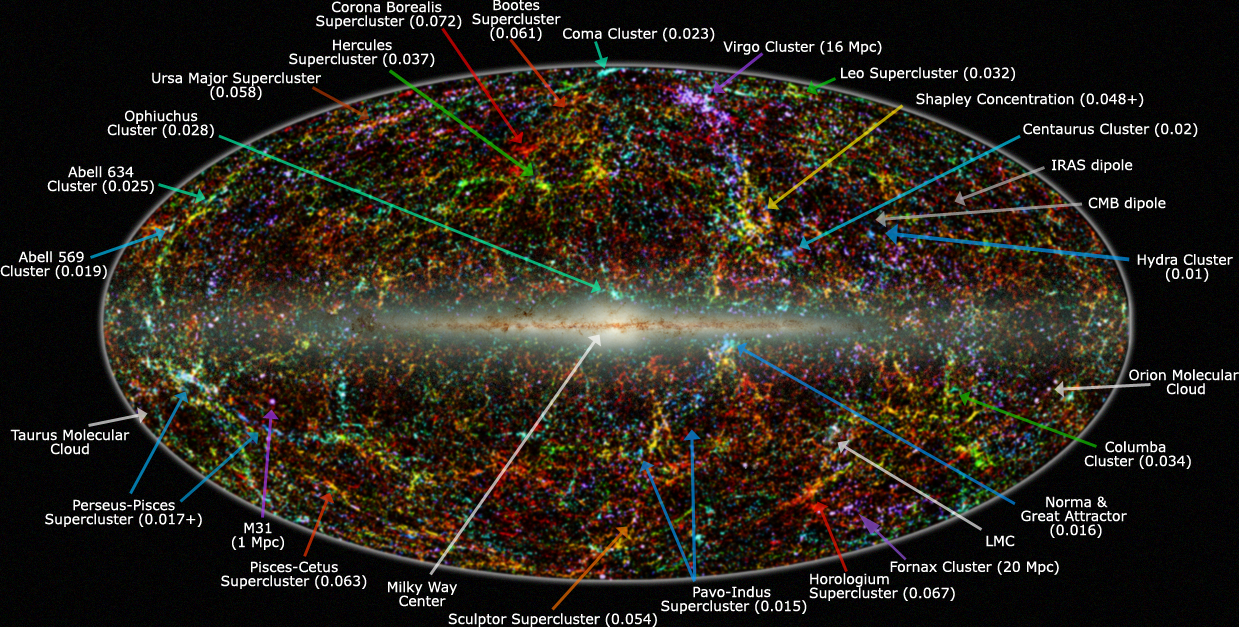
Selection of astronomical bodies and objects:
- Moon Mimas and Ida, an asteroid with its own moon, Dactyl
- Comet Lovejoy and Jupiter, a giant gas planet
- The Sun; Sirius A with Sirius B, a white dwarf; the Crab Nebula, a remnant supernova
- Sagittarius A* black hole image; Vela Pulsar, a rotating neutron star
- M80, a globular cluster, and the Pleiades, an open star cluster
- The Whirlpool Galaxy and Abell 2744, a galaxy cluster

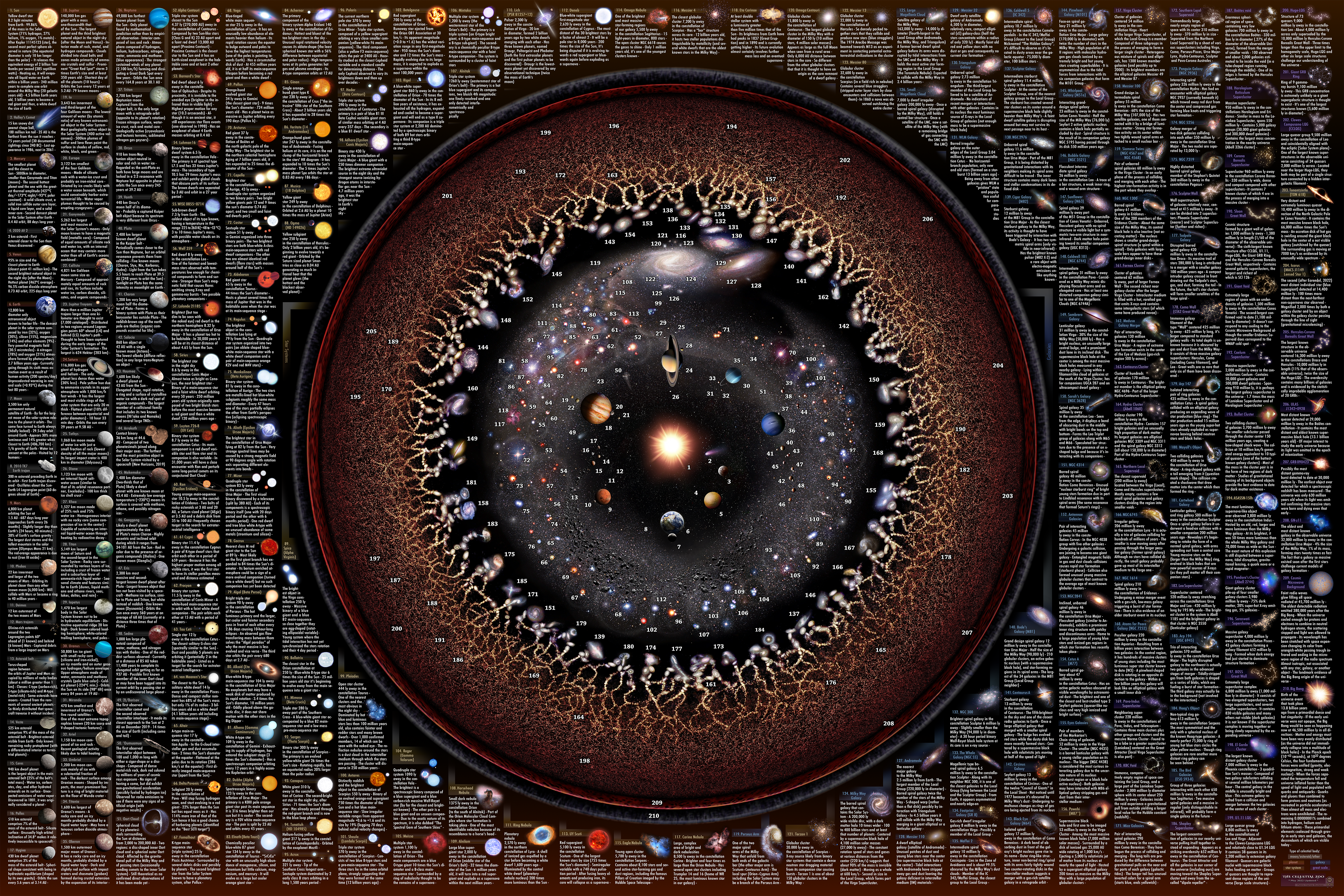
Notable astronomical objects and their known physical features

This is a list of lists, grouped by type of astronomical object.

== Solar System ==
- List of Solar System objects
- List of gravitationally rounded objects of the Solar System
- List of Solar System objects most distant from the Sun
- List of Solar System objects by size
- Lists of geological features of the Solar System
- List of natural satellites (moons)
- Lists of small Solar System bodies
- List of meteor showers

=== Minor planets ===
- Lists of minor planets
  - List of centaurs (small Solar System bodies)
  - List of damocloids
  - List of dwarf planets
  - List of exceptional asteroids
  - List of fast rotators (minor planets)
  - List of minor planet moons
  - List of named minor planets (alphabetical)
  - List of named minor planets (numerical)
  - List of possible dwarf planets
  - List of predicted asteroid impacts on Earth
  - List of slow rotators (minor planets)
  - List of trans-Neptunian objects
  - List of tumblers (small Solar System bodies)
  - List of unnumbered minor planets

=== Comets ===
- List of comets by type
- List of minor planets and comets visited by spacecraft
- List of comets with no meaningful orbit
- List of Halley-type comets
- List of parabolic and hyperbolic comets
- List of long-period comets
- List of near-parabolic comets
- List of numbered comets
- List of periodic comets

== Exoplanets, exomoons, and brown dwarfs ==
- Lists of planets
  - List of nearest exoplanets
  - List of largest exoplanets
  - List of smallest exoplanets
  - List of directly imaged exoplanets
  - List of exoplanet extremes
  - List of exoplanet firsts
  - List of exoplanets discovered by the Kepler space telescope
  - List of exoplanets observed during Kepler's K2 mission
  - List of hottest exoplanets
  - List of coolest exoplanets
  - List of extrasolar candidates for liquid water
  - List of terrestrial exoplanet candidates for atmosphere detection
  - List of potentially habitable exoplanets
  - List of proper names of exoplanets
- List of exomoon candidates
- List of brown dwarfs
  - List of Y-dwarfs
- List of rogue planets

== Stars and star systems ==
- Lists of stars
  - List of brightest stars
  - List of hottest stars
  - List of coolest stars
  - List of nearest bright stars
  - List of most luminous stars
  - List of most massive stars
    - List of nearest massive stars
  - List of largest stars
  - List of stars with resolved images
  - List of smallest stars
  - List of oldest stars
  - List of star extremes
  - List of stars with proplyds
  - List of variable stars
    - List of Wolf-Rayet stars
    - List of luminous blue variable stars
    - List of O-type stars
    - List of stars that have unusual dimming periods
  - List of X-ray pulsars
  - List of brown dwarfs
  - List of white dwarfs
- List of multiplanetary systems

=== Lists of stars by distance ===
- List of nearest stars (stars within 20 light-years)
  - List of nearest stars by spectral type
  - List of nearest bright stars
- List of star systems within 20–25 light-years
- List of star systems within 25–30 light-years
- List of star systems within 30–35 light-years
- List of star systems within 35–40 light-years
- List of star systems within 40–45 light-years
- List of star systems within 45–50 light-years
- List of star systems within 50–55 light-years
- List of star systems within 55–60 light-years
- List of star systems within 60–65 light-years
- List of star systems within 65–70 light-years
- List of star systems within 70–75 light-years
- List of star systems within 75–80 light-years
- List of star systems within 80–85 light-years
- List of star systems within 85–90 light-years
- List of star systems within 90–95 light-years
- List of star systems within 95–100 light-years
- List of star systems within 100–150 light-years
- List of star systems within 150–200 light-years
- List of star systems within 200–250 light-years
- List of star systems within 250–300 light-years
- List of star systems within 300–350 light-years
- List of star systems within 350–400 light-years
- List of star systems within 400–450 light-years
- List of star systems within 450–500 light-years
- List of most distant stars

=== Lists of stars by luminosity ===
- List of nearest giant stars
- List of nearest supergiants
- List of nearest hypergiants

== Novae and supernovae ==
- List of novae in the Milky Way galaxy
  - List of novae in 2018
  - List of novae in 2019
  - List of recurrent novae
  - List of nova remnants
- List of supernovae
  - List of supernovae (before 2000)
- List of supernova candidates
- List of supernova remnants
- List of gamma-ray bursts

== Star constellations ==
- Lists of constellations
  - Lists of stars by constellation
  - List of constellations by area
  - List of IAU designated constellations

== Clusters ==
=== Star clusters ===
- List of open clusters
- List of globular clusters
- List of infrared clusters
- List of most massive star clusters
- List of stellar streams
- List of nearby stellar associations and moving groups
- List of star-forming regions in the Local Group

=== Galaxy groups and clusters ===
- Galaxy filaments
- List of galaxy groups and clusters
  - List of Abell clusters
- List of quasars
  - List of microquasars
  - List of large quasar groups
- Superclusters

== Nebulae ==
- List of dark nebulae
- List of diffuse nebulae
- List of largest nebulae
- List of planetary nebulae
- List of protoplanetary nebulae

== Galaxies ==
- List of galaxies
  - List of galaxies by surface brightness
  - List of galaxies with richest globular cluster systems
  - List of largest galaxies
  - List of largest radio galaxies
  - List of nearest galaxies
  - List of polar-ring galaxies
  - List of quasars
  - List of ring galaxies
  - List of smallest galaxies
  - List of spiral galaxies
- List of Andromeda's satellite galaxies
- List of Triangulum's suspected satellite galaxies
- Satellite galaxies of the Milky Way

== Black holes ==
- List of black holes
- List of fastest rotating black holes
- List of most massive black holes
- List of least massive black holes
- List of nearest known black holes
- List of quasars

== Other lists ==
- List of astronomical objects named after people
- List of future astronomical events
- List of voids
  - List of largest voids
- List of largest cosmic structures
- List of the most distant astronomical objects
- List of neutron stars
- List of most massive neutron stars
- List of resolved circumstellar disks
- List of brightest natural objects in the sky
- List of gravitational wave observations
- List of lower mass gap objects

== Astronomical catalogues ==
- List of astronomical catalogues
  - List of Messier objects
  - List of Caldwell objects
  - List of Herschel 400 objects
  - List of Melotte objects
  - List of Collinder objects
  - List of Köhler objects

=== Galaxies ===
- List of NGC objects
  - List of NGC objects (1–1000)
  - List of NGC objects (1001–2000)
  - List of NGC objects (2001–3000)
  - List of NGC objects (3001–4000)
  - List of NGC objects (4001–5000)
  - List of NGC objects (5001–6000)
  - List of NGC objects (6001–7000)
  - List of NGC objects (7001–7840)
- List of IC objects
- List of UDF objects
  - List of UDF objects (1–500)
- List of UGC objects
  - List of UGC objects (1-1000)
- List of Arp objects
- List of DDO objects

=== Nebulae ===
- List of Barnard Objects
- List of Sharpless objects
- List of RCW objects
- List of Gum Objects
- List of vdB Objects
- List of LBN Objects
- List of LDN Objects

=== Stars ===
- List of Winnecke objects
- List of Gliese & GJ objects
  - List of Gliese and GJ objects (1-1000)

=== Exoplanets ===
- List of Kepler objects
  - List of Kepler objects (1–500)
  - List of Kepler objects (501–1000)
  - List of Kepler objects (1001–1500)
  - List of Kepler objects (1501–2000)
  - List of Kepler objects (2001–2500)
- List of Kepler's K2 objects
- List of HAT-P objects
- List of WASP objects
- List of XO objects
- List of CoRoT objects
- List of MOA objects
- List of OGLE objects
- List of KELT Objects

== Map of astronomical objects ==
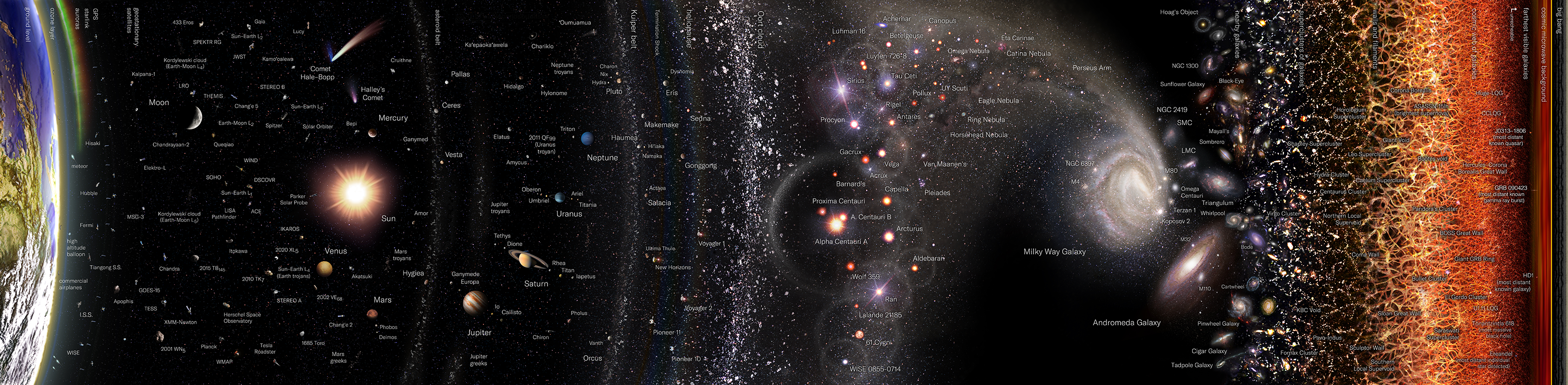
In this map of the Observable Universe, objects appear enlarged to show their shape. From left to right celestial bodies are arranged according to their proximity to the Earth. This horizontal (distance to Earth) scale is logarithmic.

== See also ==
- American Astronomical Society
- Outline of astronomy
- Lists of astronauts
- List of government space agencies
- List of planetariums
- Lists of space scientists
- List of telescopes
- Outline of space exploration
