= List of exoplanets discovered by the Kepler space telescope =

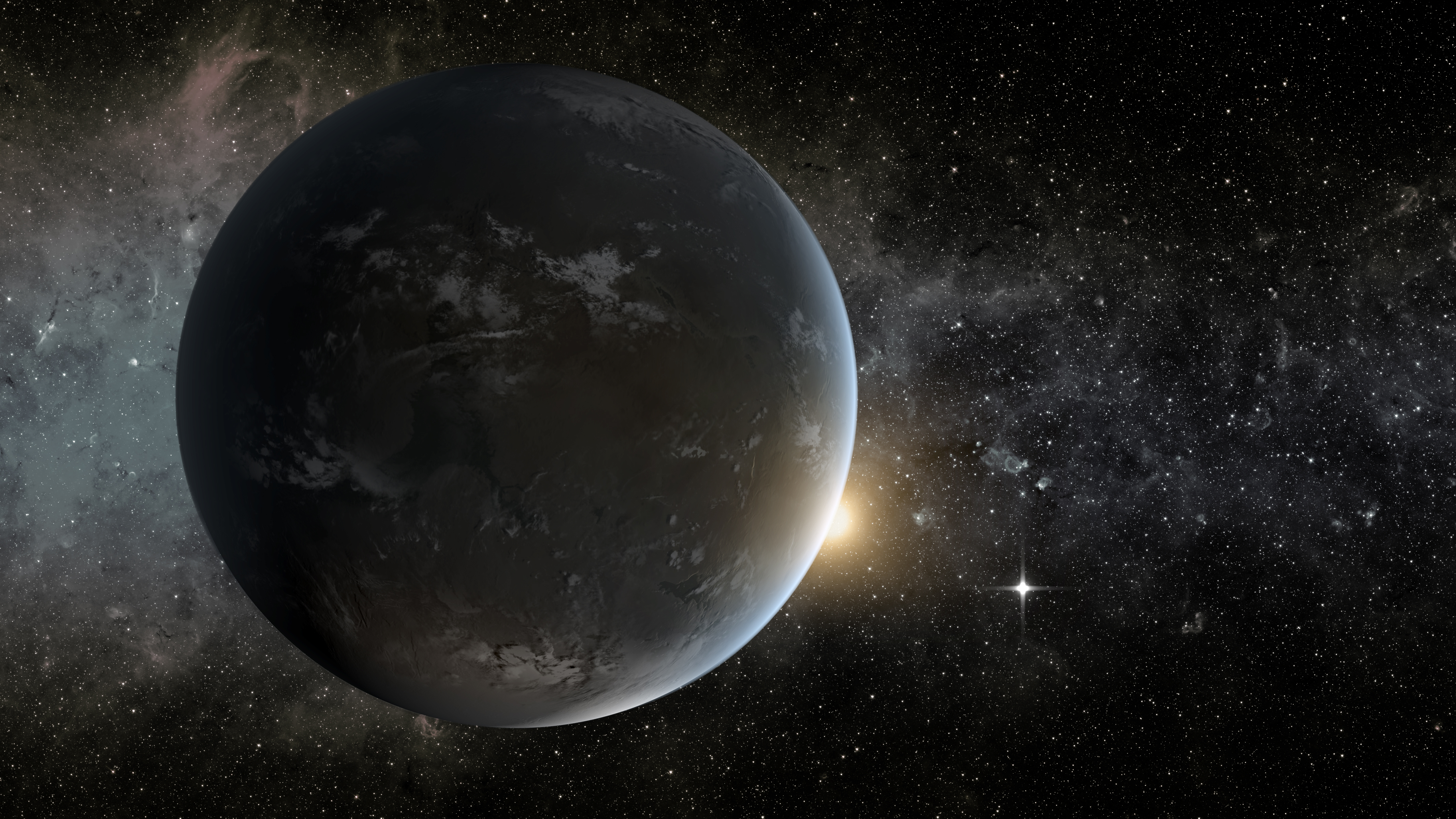
An artist's rendition of Kepler-62f, a potentially habitable exoplanet discovered using data transmitted by the Kepler space telescope

The list of exoplanets detected by the Kepler space telescope contains bodies with a wide variety of properties, with significant ranges in orbital distances, masses, radii, composition, habitability, and host star type. As of June 16 2023, the Kepler space telescope and its follow-up observations have detected 2,778 planets, including hot Jupiters, super-Earths, circumbinary planets, and planets located in the circumstellar habitable zones of their host stars. Kepler has detected over 3,601 unconfirmed planet candidates and 2,165 eclipsing binary stars.

In addition to detecting planets itself, Kepler has also uncovered the properties of three previously known extrasolar planets. Public Kepler data has also been used by groups independent of NASA, such as the Planet Hunters citizen-science project, to detect several planets orbiting stars collectively known as Kepler Objects of Interest.

Kepler, launched on March 7, 2009, was designed to observe a fixed portion of the sky in visible light and measure the light curves of the various stars in its field of view, looking for planets crossing in front of their host stars via the transit method. Since the launch of the spacecraft, though, both the Kepler team at NASA and independent researchers have found new ways of detecting planets, including the use of the transit timing variation method and relativistic beaming. In addition, gravitational microlensing has been proposed as a method of using Kepler to detect compact objects, such as white dwarfs, neutron stars, and black holes. Kepler has also measured the reflected light from some planets already known, discovering planets undetectable with the transit method as well as improving knowledge of the characteristics of planets already discovered.

On February 26, 2014, NASA announced the discovery of 715 newly verified exoplanets around 305 stars by the Kepler Space Telescope. The exoplanets were found using a statistical technique called "verification by multiplicity". 95% of the discovered exoplanets were smaller than Neptune and four, including Kepler-296f, were less than 2 1/2 the size of Earth and were in habitable zones where surface temperatures are suitable for liquid water.

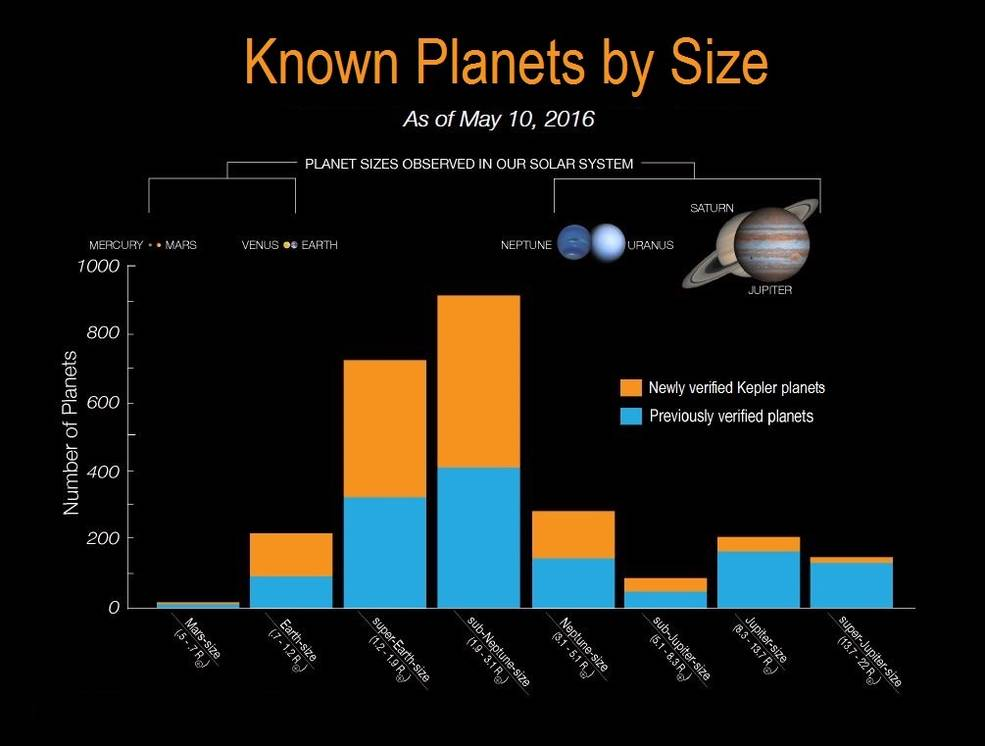
Bar graph of Exoplanets by size - the gold bars represent Kepler's latest newly verified exoplanets (May 10, 2016).

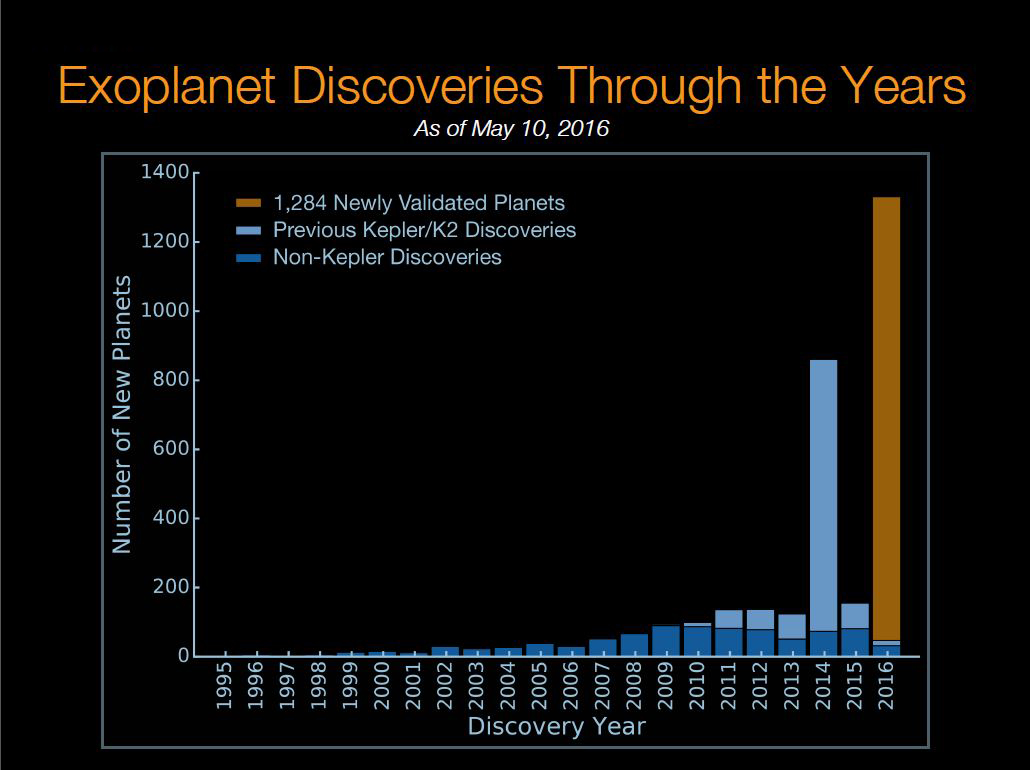
Bar graph of Exoplanet Discoveries - gold bar displays new planets "verified by multiplicity" (May 10, 2016).

On May 10, 2016, NASA announced that the Kepler mission has verified 1,284 new planets. Based on some of the planet's sizes, about 550 could potentially be rocky planets. Nine of these orbit in their stars' habitable zone.

== Lists ==
All exoplanets discovered lie in one of the three northern constellations of Cygnus, Lyra and Draco, which belong to Kepler's photometer's field of view.

- List of exoplanets discovered by the Kepler space telescope: 1–500
- List of exoplanets discovered by the Kepler space telescope: 501–1000
- List of exoplanets discovered by the Kepler space telescope: 1001–1500
- List of exoplanets discovered by the Kepler space telescope: 1501–2000
- List of exoplanets discovered by the Kepler space telescope: 2001–2500

== See also ==
- Lists of exoplanets
- Exoplanet
- List of exoplanets discovered by the TESS mission
