= List of galaxies by surface brightness =

This is a list of galaxies sorted by surface brightness. Surface brightness is a measure of how bright a diffuse object like a galaxy or nebula appears over its extended surface. The brightness over the entire galaxy is called apparent magnitude.

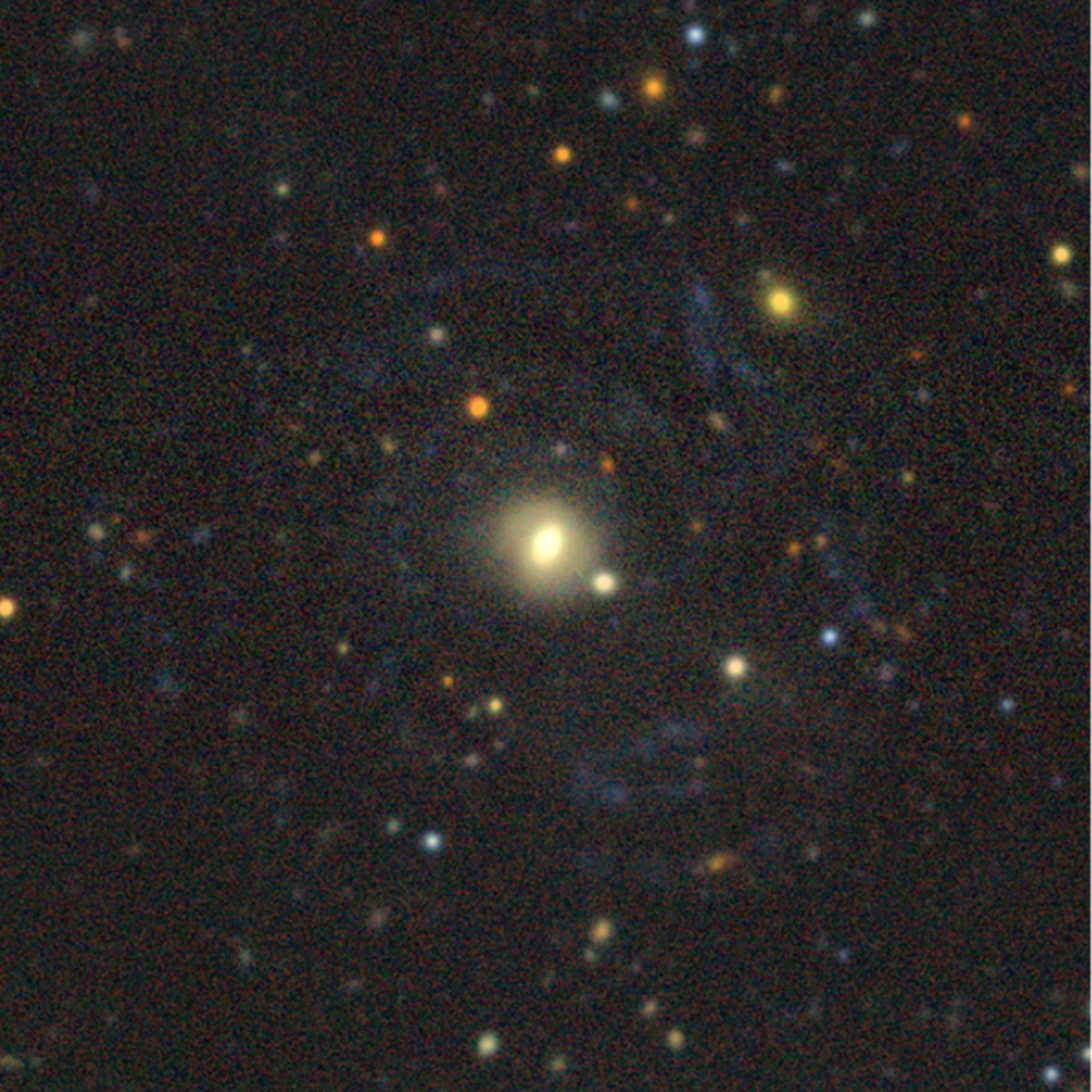
Malin 1 is a low surface brightness galaxy with a faint blue spiral structure.

== Table ==
The surface brightness is calculated via $S = m + 2.5\log_{10} A$. Where $S$ is surface brightness, $m$ is total magnitude, and $A$ is the total area in square arcseconds. Area is calculated using the formula for an ellipse; $\pi ab$, where $a$ is the semi-major axis and $b$ is the semi-minor axis. Each axis is half of the dimension, because each dimension is the entire length/height but the axis is only the length/height to the centre, this combined with the symmetry of an ellipse means that half the dimension is the axis.

Combining this with the original formula we get: $S = m + 2.5\log_{10} (\pi \frac a{2} \frac b{2})$, which simplifies to $S=m+2.5\log_{10}\frac {\pi ab}{4}$.

Galaxy	Image	Surface Brightness(mag/arcsecond^{2})	Apparent Magnitude	Dimensions	Distance(Mly)	Type	Notes	Citations
Messier 82		17.40(R_{c}) 19.10(r) 20.87(B)	8.4	9x4 arcminutes(540x240 arcseconds)	12	Spiral	Has rapid star formation due to interactions with M81 making red streaks.	
Messier 32		20.93	8.1	8x6 arcminutes(480x360 arcseconds)	2.5	Elliptical	Satellite galaxy of the Andromeda Galaxy	
NGC 3632		21.17	10.6	3x2 arcminutes(180x120 arcseconds)	70	Spiral		
Messier 81		21.29(B) 19.30(r)	6.9	21x10 arcminutes(1260x600 arcseconds)	11.6	Spiral	Faintest galaxy visible to the naked eye, despite the naked eye limiting magnitude of a star being fainter, surface brightness limits this for galaxies.	
Whirlpool Galaxy		21.74	8.4	11x7 arcminutes(660x420 arcseconds)	31	Spiral	Has a nearby galaxy in a merger.	
Messier 58		21.91	9.8	5.5x4.5 arcminutes(330x270 arcseconds)	62	Spiral		
Andromeda Galaxy		22.19	3.44	178x63 arcminutes(10680x3780 arcseconds)	2.54	Spiral/ring	Its core is significantly brighter than its outer disk.	
Messier 87		22.45	9.6	7 arcminutes(138544.23 square arcseconds)	54	Elliptical	Roughly round, so $\pi r^2$ is used along with angular diameter.	
Messier 49		22.6	9.4	9x7.5 arcminutes(540x450 arcseconds)	60	Elliptical		
Triangulum Galaxy		23	5.7	70.8x41.7 arcminutes(4248x2502 arcseconds)	3	Spiral		
