= List of exoplanets discovered by the Kepler space telescope: 1001–1500 =

This is a partial list of exoplanets discovered by the Kepler space telescope, running from star number 1001 through 1500, inclusive.

Table keys
Planet type
Circumbinary planet
Planet orbits a single star in a multiple star system
Planet has a circumbinary orbit in a system with more than 2 stars
Planet discovered by Kepler community
Potentially habitable
None of the above

== Table ==
Planet	Discovery method	Mass (M_{J})	Radius (R_{J})	Density (g/cm^{3})	Orbital period (days)	Semimajor axis (AU)	Orbital eccentricity	Year of confirmation	Ref.
Earth (for reference)		0.00315	0.0892	5.515	365.2563	1	0.0167	—	
Kepler-1001b	Transit	—	0.281+0.03 −0.043	—	14.30511983 ±0.0000434	—	—	2016	
Kepler-1002b	Transit	—	0.153+0.005 −0.004	—	4.33642933 ±0.00000695	—	—	2016	
Kepler-1003b	Transit	—	0.159+0.043 −0.02	—	3.55485691 ±0.00000671	—	—	2016	
Kepler-1004b	Transit	—	0.56+0.07 −0.039	—	5.28789787 ±0.00001198	—	—	2016	
Kepler-1005b	Transit	—	0.134+0.019 −0.013	—	6.49801525 ±0.0000132	—	—	2016	
Kepler-1006b	Transit	—	0.137+0.024 −0.012	—	19.76172042 ±0.0000667	—	—	2016	
Kepler-1007b	Transit	—	0.128±0.006	—	5.18500207 ±0.00000932	—	—	2016	
Kepler-1008b	Transit	—	0.114+0.006 −0.004	—	12.43931193 ±0.00002837	—	—	2016	
Kepler-1009b	Transit	—	0.194+0.024 −0.021	—	11.35011917 ±0.0000225	—	—	2016	
Kepler-1010b	Transit	—	0.207+0.039 −0.016	—	34.2685705 ±0.0001181	—	—	2016	
Kepler-1011b	Transit	—	0.256+0.026 −0.039	—	5.75322197 ±0.00000942	—	—	2016	
Kepler-1012b	Transit	—	0.115+0.007 −0.005	—	5.50860439 ±0.00001151	—	—	2016	
Kepler-1013b	Transit	—	0.192+0.032 −0.018	—	18.93054959 ±0.00004672	—	—	2016	
Kepler-1014b	Transit	—	0.213+0.019 −0.022	—	16.57110363 ±0.00003817	—	—	2016	
Kepler-1015b	Transit	—	0.317+0.118 −0.059	—	16.00494214 ±0.00004175	—	—	2016	
Kepler-1016b	Transit	—	0.194+0.033 −0.025	—	1.95452434 ±0.00000331	—	—	2016	
Kepler-1016c	Transit	—	0.328+0.058 −0.033	—	105.6551369 ±0.0005452	—	—	2016	
Kepler-1017b	Transit	—	0.178+0.026 −0.011	—	7.23400469 ±0.00001433	—	—	2016	
Kepler-1018b	Transit	—	0.23+0.027 −0.017	—	49.1013514 ±0.0001876	—	—	2016	
Kepler-1019b	Transit	—	0.13+0.004 −0.014	—	1.41122985 ±0.00000075	—	—	2016	
Kepler-1020b	Transit	—	0.203+0.007 −0.008	—	96.9151496 ±0.0003632	—	—	2016	
Kepler-1021b	Transit	—	0.208+0.022 −0.016	—	13.47469571 ±0.0000321	—	—	2016	
Kepler-1022b	Transit	—	0.211+0.007 −0.025	—	10.99469878 ±0.0000188	—	—	2016	
Kepler-1023b	Transit	—	0.235+0.027 −0.016	—	62.1387714 ±0.0002199	—	—	2016	
Kepler-1024b	Transit	—	0.349+0.024 −0.023	—	66.4162133 ±0.0003538	—	—	2016	
Kepler-1025b	Transit	—	0.177+0.037 −0.02	—	37.3229493 ±0.0001363	—	—	2016	
Kepler-1026b	Transit	—	0.197+0.029 −0.013	—	36.5156053 ±0.0001037	—	—	2016	
Kepler-1027b	Transit	—	0.079+0.004 −0.002	—	1.9078052 ±0.00000246	—	—	2016	
Kepler-1028b	Transit	—	0.119+0.013 −0.01	—	2.51462432 ±0.00000495	—	—	2016	
Kepler-1029b	Transit	—	0.112+0.007 −0.006	—	4.41769648 ±0.0000089	—	—	2016	
Kepler-1030b	Transit	—	0.221+0.011 −0.016	—	19.32952416 ±0.00007474	—	—	2016	
Kepler-1031b	Transit	—	0.078+0.019 −0.01	—	1.22621732 ±0.00000451	—	—	2016	
Kepler-1032b	Transit	—	0.167+0.009 −0.007	—	3.29011795 ±0.00000505	—	—	2016	
Kepler-1033b	Transit	—	0.224+0.037 −0.016	—	7.56052806 ±0.00002405	—	—	2016	
Kepler-1034b	Transit	—	0.202+0.015 −0.012	—	12.12400943 ±0.0000332	—	—	2016	
Kepler-1035b	Transit	—	0.104+0.025 −0.01	—	2.71407755 ±0.00000371	—	—	2016	
Kepler-1036b	Transit	—	0.269+0.012 −0.047	—	122.8808058 ±0.000709	—	—	2016	
Kepler-1037b	Transit	—	0.114+0.008 −0.006	—	1.06378867 ±0.00000126	—	—	2016	
Kepler-1038b	Transit	—	0.315+0.046 −0.035	—	148.4603382 ±0.0006894	—	—	2016	
Kepler-1039b	Transit	—	0.13+0.008 −0.02	—	0.93488424 ±0.00000087	—	—	2016	
Kepler-1040b	Transit	—	0.186+0.016 −0.009	—	201.1214 ±0.001945	—	—	2016	
Kepler-1041b	Transit	—	0.262+0.055 −0.047	—	24.7576421 ±0.0001112	—	—	2016	
Kepler-1042b	Transit	—	0.195+0.01 −0.014	—	10.13202575 ±0.00003028	—	—	2016	
Kepler-1043b	Transit	—	0.227+0.035 −0.021	—	38.5053398 ±0.0001785	—	—	2016	
Kepler-1044b	Transit	—	0.238+0.055 −0.026	—	6.77408868 ±0.00001867	—	—	2016	
Kepler-1045b	Transit	—	0.24+0.019 −0.014	—	26.41045478 ±0.00007194	—	—	2016	
Kepler-1046b	Transit	—	0.153+0.011 −0.01	—	14.37508035 ±0.00004094	—	—	2016	
Kepler-1047b	Transit	—	0.186+0.023 −0.015	—	56.1886887 ±0.0002756	—	—	2016	
Kepler-1047c	Transit	—	0.088+0.012 −0.008	—	3.18897601 ±0.00002038	—	—	2016	
Kepler-1048b	Transit	—	0.144+0.008 −0.007	—	6.92101021 ±0.00002415	—	—	2016	
Kepler-1049b	Transit	—	0.085+0.009 −0.014	—	3.27346074 ±0.00000531	—	—	2016	
Kepler-1050b	Transit	—	0.143+0.043 −0.016	—	15.3787546 ±0.00006915	—	—	2016	
Kepler-1050c	Transit	—	0.132+0.031 −0.014	—	21.1284569 ±0.000112	—	—	2016	
Kepler-1051b	Transit	—	0.303+0.11 −0.06	—	25.96200249 ±0.00008634	—	—	2016	
Kepler-1052b	Transit	—	0.261+0.048 −0.028	—	34.8538276 ±0.000126	—	—	2016	
Kepler-1053b	Transit	—	0.087±0.004	—	2.41435165 ±0.00000254	—	—	2016	
Kepler-1054b	Transit	—	0.235+0.103 −0.047	—	4.30655689 ±0.00001426	—	—	2016	
Kepler-1055b	Transit	—	0.11+0.006 −0.005	—	2.29503623 ±0.00000347	—	—	2016	
Kepler-1056b	Transit	—	0.269+0.119 −0.054	—	27.495606 ±0.0001457	—	—	2016	
Kepler-1057b	Transit	—	0.3+0.098 −0.046	—	14.08827448 ±0.00004045	—	—	2016	
Kepler-1058b	Transit	—	0.243+0.01 −0.029	—	110.96546 ±0.001146	—	—	2016	
Kepler-1059b	Transit	—	0.154+0.011 −0.013	—	3.76419105 ±0.00000954	—	—	2016	
Kepler-1060b	Transit	—	0.212+0.04 −0.026	—	46.8779367 ±0.000305	—	—	2016	
Kepler-1061b	Transit	—	0.177+0.01 −0.033	—	2.75798267 ±0.00000388	—	—	2016	
Kepler-1062b	Transit	—	0.157+0.008 −0.009	—	9.30412078 ±0.00002394	—	—	2016	
Kepler-1063b	Transit	—	0.133+0.036 −0.017	—	14.07971466 ±0.00002871	—	—	2016	
Kepler-1064b	Transit	—	0.138+0.006 −0.004	—	16.54080322 ±0.00004111	—	—	2016	
Kepler-1065b	Transit	—	0.333+0.057 −0.032	—	3.60930891 ±0.0000051	—	—	2016	
Kepler-1065c	Transit	—	0.143+0.021 −0.015	—	2.37030743 ±0.00001691	—	—	2016	
Kepler-1066b	Transit	—	0.211+0.045 −0.029	—	1.93155984 ±0.00000157	—	—	2016	
Kepler-1067b	Transit	—	0.071+0.011 −0.005	—	0.76212926 ±0.00000273	—	—	2016	
Kepler-1068b	Transit	—	0.324+0.079 −0.033	—	16.92344113 ±0.00005446	—	—	2016	
Kepler-1069b	Transit	—	0.143+0.028 −0.012	—	23.8990296 ±0.0001497	—	—	2016	
Kepler-1070b	Transit	—	0.154+0.072 −0.022	—	6.2216147 ±0.00001944	—	—	2016	
Kepler-1071b	Transit	—	0.212+0.006 −0.012	—	6.1799844 ±0.00001367	—	—	2016	
Kepler-1072b	Transit	—	0.141+0.064 −0.021	—	1.5690665 ±0.0000029	—	—	2016	
Kepler-1073b	Transit	—	0.205+0.044 −0.022	—	8.67888593 ±0.00002409	—	—	2016	
Kepler-1073c	Transit	—	0.146+0.03 −0.016	—	4.02582254 ±0.00001484	—	—	2016	
Kepler-1074b	Transit	—	0.112+0.021 −0.008	—	5.94566534 ±0.00001443	—	—	2016	
Kepler-1075b	Transit	—	0.127+0.014 −0.029	—	1.52372816 ±0.0000027	—	—	2016	
Kepler-1076b	Transit	—	0.071+0.004 −0.003	—	6.14727918 ±0.00002112	—	—	2016	
Kepler-1077b	Transit	—	0.247+0.062 −0.029	—	34.3511874 ±0.0001503	—	—	2016	
Kepler-1078b	Transit	—	0.17+0.027 −0.029	—	3.00725242 ±0.00001242	—	—	2016	
Kepler-1079b	Transit	—	0.145+0.029 −0.025	—	13.24503188 ±0.00004886	—	—	2016	
Kepler-1080b	Transit	—	0.293+0.101 −0.045	—	77.2548396 ±0.0003198	—	—	2016	
Kepler-1081b	Transit	—	0.09+0.009 −0.006	—	3.85691855 ±0.00000966	—	—	2016	
Kepler-1082b	Transit	—	0.1+0.016 −0.012	—	1.5432066 ±0.00000454	—	—	2016	
Kepler-1083b	Transit	—	0.3+0.014 −0.056	—	33.4177993 ±0.0001854	—	—	2016	
Kepler-1084b	Transit	—	0.099+0.021 −0.013	—	2.05333679 ±0.00000413	—	—	2016	
Kepler-1085b	Transit	—	0.644+0.158 −0.066	—	219.3217528 ±0.0008946	—	—	2016	
Kepler-1086b	Transit	—	0.218+0.031 −0.025	—	18.78425728 ±0.00005283	—	—	2016	
Kepler-1086c	Transit	—	0.262+0.01 −0.012	—	161.5163345 ±0.0008629	—	—	2016	
Kepler-1087b	Transit	—	0.054+0.015 −0.004	—	0.69384285 ±0.00000159	—	—	2016	
Kepler-1088b	Transit	—	0.127+0.01 −0.009	—	23.12748644 ±0.00008919	—	—	2016	
Kepler-1089b	Transit	—	0.163+0.009 −0.03	—	5.13248562 ±0.00000948	—	—	2016	
Kepler-1090b	Transit	—	0.201+0.019 −0.015	—	198.680179 ±0.002176	—	—	2016	
Kepler-1091b	Transit	—	0.13+0.032 −0.017	—	1.43474156 ±0.00000327	—	—	2016	
Kepler-1092b	Transit	—	0.185+0.033 −0.021	—	58.6017925 ±0.0006006	—	—	2016	
Kepler-1093b	Transit	—	0.174+0.055 −0.022	—	25.0824626 ±0.0001211	—	—	2016	
Kepler-1093c	Transit	—	0.175+0.064 −0.024	—	89.722292 ±0.00108	—	—	2016	
Kepler-1094b	Transit	—	0.284+0.107 −0.041	—	78.1000231 ±0.0006388	—	—	2016	
Kepler-1095b	Transit	—	0.108+0.018 −0.011	—	4.27103091 ±0.0000148	—	—	2016	
Kepler-1096b	Transit	—	0.111+0.033 −0.007	—	2.89221751 ±0.000006	—	—	2016	
Kepler-1097b	Transit	—	0.291±0.023	—	187.747029 ±0.001894	—	—	2016	
Kepler-1098b	Transit	—	0.116+0.021 −0.012	—	2.54307286 ±0.00000959	—	—	2016	
Kepler-1099b	Transit	—	0.252+0.038 −0.045	—	2.16845259 ±0.0000028	—	—	2016	
Kepler-1100b	Transit	—	0.156+0.073 −0.026	—	6.42200058 ±0.00002182	—	—	2016	
Kepler-1101b	Transit	—	0.22+0.033 −0.019	—	81.3151059 ±0.0005693	—	—	2016	
Kepler-1102b	Transit	—	0.237+0.047 −0.021	—	51.3285623 ±0.0003326	—	—	2016	
Kepler-1103b	Transit	—	0.203+0.054 −0.024	—	19.79191978 ±0.00009543	—	—	2016	
Kepler-1104b	Transit	—	0.11+0.012 −0.009	—	5.03728015 ±0.00001378	—	—	2016	
Kepler-1105b	Transit	—	0.179+0.005 −0.022	—	4.42157218 ±0.00000977	—	—	2016	
Kepler-1106b	Transit	—	0.147+0.044 −0.021	—	1.25275217 ±0.00000215	—	—	2016	
Kepler-1107b	Transit	—	0.12+0.009 −0.007	—	0.57103852 ±0.00000042	—	—	2016	
Kepler-1108b	Transit	—	0.13+0.012 −0.01	—	4.51005748 ±0.0000133	—	—	2016	
Kepler-1109b	Transit	—	0.195+0.039 −0.021	—	37.6467384 ±0.000212	—	—	2016	
Kepler-1110b	Transit	—	0.237+0.034 −0.023	—	9.69312032 ±0.00003024	—	—	2016	
Kepler-1111b	Transit	—	0.178+0.048 −0.023	—	8.79617863 ±0.0000297	—	—	2016	
Kepler-1112b	Transit	—	0.269+0.114 −0.046	—	14.36267939 ±0.00005701	—	—	2016	
Kepler-1113b	Transit	—	0.251+0.101 −0.032	—	42.3004954 ±0.0002092	—	—	2016	
Kepler-1114b	Transit	—	0.12+0.007 −0.006	—	14.97435694 ±0.00005221	—	—	2016	
Kepler-1115b	Transit	—	0.152+0.026 −0.018	—	23.5540725 ±0.0001356	—	—	2016	
Kepler-1116b	Transit	—	0.227+0.048 −0.02	—	41.6977827 ±0.0002004	—	—	2016	
Kepler-1117b	Transit	—	0.099+0.015 −0.007	—	4.79028459 ±0.0000186	—	—	2016	
Kepler-1118b	Transit	—	0.244+0.054 −0.038	—	38.6715075 ±0.0002298	—	—	2016	
Kepler-1119b	Transit	—	0.171+0.056 −0.027	—	8.3265153 ±0.00004777	—	—	2016	
Kepler-1120b	Transit	—	0.123+0.008 −0.006	—	2.94902905 ±0.00000747	—	—	2016	
Kepler-1121b	Transit	—	0.17+0.043 −0.041	—	13.15141081 ±0.00005864	—	—	2016	
Kepler-1122b	Transit	—	0.182+0.024 −0.012	—	42.1917357 ±0.0002996	—	—	2016	
Kepler-1123b	Transit	—	0.149+0.022 −0.01	—	4.33946454 ±0.00001178	—	—	2016	
Kepler-1124b	Transit	—	0.114+0.011 −0.006	—	2.85234897 ±0.00000303	—	—	2016	
Kepler-1125b	Transit	—	0.164+0.027 −0.016	—	17.6700642 ±0.0001176	—	—	2016	
Kepler-1126b	Transit	—	0.154+0.019 −0.012	—	108.593329 ±0.001003	—	—	2016	
Kepler-1127b	Transit	—	0.175+0.028 −0.037	—	5.12330347 ±0.00002272	—	—	2016	
Kepler-1128b	Transit	—	0.326+0.047 −0.03	—	61.6178167 ±0.0003337	—	—	2016	
Kepler-1129b	Transit	—	0.264+0.045 −0.029	—	24.3397804 ±0.0001298	—	—	2016	
Kepler-1129c	Transit	—	0.244+0.041 −0.024	—	76.5369586 ±0.0007586	—	—	2016	
Kepler-1130b	Transit	—	0.071+0.014 −0.003	—	5.45298175 ±0.00001294	—	—	2016	
Kepler-1131b	Transit	—	0.142+0.032 −0.013	—	3.53232449 ±0.00001266	—	—	2016	
Kepler-1132b	Transit	—	0.21+0.017 −0.015	—	62.8916228 ±0.0004523	—	—	2016	
Kepler-1133b	Transit	—	0.176+0.021 −0.013	—	11.55562343 ±0.00003409	—	—	2016	
Kepler-1134b	Transit	—	0.236+0.019 −0.023	—	17.13263989 ±0.00008204	—	—	2016	
Kepler-1135b	Transit	—	0.165+0.029 −0.014	—	76.957857 ±0.0007104	—	—	2016	
Kepler-1136b	Transit	—	0.146+0.009 −0.008	—	2.36172433 ±0.00000365	—	—	2016	
Kepler-1137b	Transit	—	0.196+0.074 −0.036	—	23.9210791 ±0.0001379	—	—	2016	
Kepler-1138b	Transit	—	0.152+0.021 −0.012	—	3.17060005 ±0.00001019	—	—	2016	
Kepler-1139b	Transit	—	0.106+0.015 −0.007	—	0.81316672 ±0.00000125	—	—	2016	
Kepler-1140b	Transit	—	0.247+0.04 −0.033	—	24.0862707 ±0.000102	—	—	2016	
Kepler-1141b	Transit	—	0.073+0.011 −0.007	—	2.34451194 ±0.00000535	—	—	2016	
Kepler-1142b	Transit	—	0.131+0.038 −0.016	—	18.3027248 ±0.0001389	—	—	2016	
Kepler-1143b	Transit	—	0.149+0.012 −0.01	—	2.88890485 ±0.00000694	—	—	2016	
Kepler-1143c	Transit	—	0.321+0.045 −0.031	—	210.630591 ±0.001456	—	—	2016	
Kepler-1144b	Transit	—	0.178+0.027 −0.014	—	17.14647302 ±0.00009073	—	—	2016	
Kepler-1145b	Transit	—	0.125±0.01	—	3.97076766 ±0.0000111	—	—	2016	
Kepler-1146b	Transit	—	0.11+0.009 −0.007	—	2.3522658 ±0.00000825	—	—	2016	
Kepler-1147b	Transit	—	0.233+0.071 −0.045	—	10.62784997 ±0.00009118	—	—	2016	
Kepler-1148b	Transit	—	0.151+0.009 −0.008	—	1.10446351 ±0.00000129	—	—	2016	
Kepler-1149b	Transit	—	0.128+0.023 −0.015	—	3.73089898 ±0.00001502	—	—	2016	
Kepler-1150b	Transit	—	0.091±0.005	—	2.78786839 ±0.00000826	—	—	2016	
Kepler-1151b	Transit	—	0.198+0.021 −0.015	—	65.6478424 ±0.000401	—	—	2016	
Kepler-1152b	Transit	—	0.078+0.004 −0.005	—	1.64680191 ±0.00000267	—	—	2016	
Kepler-1153b	Transit	—	0.154+0.019 −0.01	—	1.75583533 ±0.00000439	—	—	2016	
Kepler-1154b	Transit	—	0.209+0.095 −0.044	—	5.1856142 ±0.00002676	—	—	2016	
Kepler-1154c	Transit	—	0.211+0.085 −0.044	—	8.45808312 ±0.00004757	—	—	2016	
Kepler-1155b	Transit	—	0.181+0.04 −0.018	—	33.469743 ±0.0002003	—	—	2016	
Kepler-1156b	Transit	—	0.118+0.012 −0.008	—	11.89520511 ±0.00006499	—	—	2016	
Kepler-1157b	Transit	—	0.097+0.004 −0.018	—	4.45743164 ±0.00001699	—	—	2016	
Kepler-1158b	Transit	—	0.209±0.041	—	13.5396293 ±0.00009329	—	—	2016	
Kepler-1159b	Transit	—	0.211+0.092 −0.033	—	22.70816791 ±0.00009541	—	—	2016	
Kepler-1160b	Transit	—	0.191+0.025 −0.012	—	7.97034958 ±0.00003122	—	—	2016	
Kepler-1161b	Transit	—	0.19+0.045 −0.012	—	10.71252541 ±0.00003876	—	—	2016	
Kepler-1162b	Transit	—	0.197+0.045 −0.019	—	32.5637069 ±0.0002472	—	—	2016	
Kepler-1163b	Transit	—	0.092+0.015 −0.01	—	6.11786898 ±0.00002808	—	—	2016	
Kepler-1164b	Transit	—	0.1+0.004 −0.006	—	3.97599768 ±0.00001086	—	—	2016	
Kepler-1165b	Transit	—	0.138+0.045 −0.017	—	9.478522 ±0.00005909	—	—	2016	
Kepler-1166b	Transit	—	0.151+0.055 −0.012	—	33.2406882 ±0.00028	—	—	2016	
Kepler-1167b	Transit	—	0.153±0.011	—	1.00393374 ±0.00000268	—	—	2016	
Kepler-1168b	Transit	—	0.223+0.016 −0.012	—	55.8226539 ±0.0003871	—	—	2016	
Kepler-1169b	Transit	—	0.084±0.005	—	6.11009134 ±0.00002806	—	—	2016	
Kepler-1170b	Transit	—	0.215+0.017 −0.015	—	9.98969327 ±0.00004242	—	—	2016	
Kepler-1171b	Transit	—	0.228+0.061 −0.045	—	1.44259224 ±0.00000219	—	—	2016	
Kepler-1172b	Transit	—	0.285+0.036 −0.025	—	26.0204423 ±0.0001886	—	—	2016	
Kepler-1173b	Transit	—	0.079+0.021 −0.006	—	0.7698536 ±0.0000012	—	—	2016	
Kepler-1174b	Transit	—	0.142+0.028 −0.014	—	6.89225223 ±0.00002664	—	—	2016	
Kepler-1175b	Transit	—	0.267+0.024 −0.021	—	37.94563 ±0.0001732	—	—	2016	
Kepler-1176b	Transit	—	0.219+0.056 −0.029	—	24.1738579 ±0.0001336	—	—	2016	
Kepler-1177b	Transit	—	0.17+0.014 −0.011	—	106.247547 ±0.001822	—	—	2016	
Kepler-1178b	Transit	—	0.095+0.005 −0.007	—	31.80634 ±0.0003857	—	—	2016	
Kepler-1179b	Transit	—	0.118+0.008 −0.007	—	2.68505749 ±0.0000041	—	—	2016	
Kepler-1180b	Transit	—	0.178+0.049 −0.024	—	16.8601286 ±0.0001369	—	—	2016	
Kepler-1181b	Transit	—	0.14+0.058 −0.023	—	4.89337519 ±0.00002526	—	—	2016	
Kepler-1182b	Transit	—	0.215+0.054 −0.045	—	11.17394617 ±0.00006278	—	—	2016	
Kepler-1183b	Transit	—	0.252+0.046 −0.027	—	28.5057189 ±0.0003031	—	—	2016	
Kepler-1184b	Transit	—	0.239+0.054 −0.027	—	53.5991044 ±0.0003674	—	—	2016	
Kepler-1185b	Transit	—	0.119+0.007 −0.004	—	104.3518976 ±0.0006705	—	—	2016	
Kepler-1186b	Transit	—	0.199+0.032 −0.02	—	16.07677615 ±0.00007199	—	—	2016	
Kepler-1187b	Transit	—	0.233+0.045 −0.025	—	18.87064068 ±0.00006002	—	—	2016	
Kepler-1188b	Transit	—	0.186+0.044 −0.02	—	17.1369543 ±0.0001214	—	—	2016	
Kepler-1189b	Transit	—	0.158+0.046 −0.043	—	3.78858982 ±0.00002274	—	—	2016	
Kepler-1190b	Transit	—	0.119+0.004 −0.01	—	10.45843441 ±0.00005281	—	—	2016	
Kepler-1191b	Transit	—	0.135+0.012 −0.01	—	5.60014851 ±0.00001909	—	—	2016	
Kepler-1192b	Transit	—	0.211+0.021 −0.02	—	25.2034787 ±0.0001278	—	—	2016	
Kepler-1193b	Transit	—	0.118+0.019 −0.015	—	2.83265213 ±0.00000903	—	—	2016	
Kepler-1194b	Transit	—	0.135+0.011 −0.008	—	16.22371307 ±0.00008867	—	—	2016	
Kepler-1195b	Transit	—	0.186+0.017 −0.015	—	8.49642241 ±0.00002872	—	—	2016	
Kepler-1196b	Transit	—	0.199+0.033 −0.019	—	66.1849031 ±0.0004661	—	—	2016	
Kepler-1197b	Transit	—	0.112+0.003 −0.008	—	2.03231845 ±0.00000375	—	—	2016	
Kepler-1198b	Transit	—	0.131+0.016 −0.009	—	7.6847716 ±0.0000325	—	—	2016	
Kepler-1199b	Transit	—	0.103+0.019 −0.014	—	15.0447198 ±0.0001084	—	—	2016	
Kepler-1200b	Transit	—	0.095+0.005 −0.007	—	1.11854972 ±0.00000312	—	—	2016	
Kepler-1201b	Transit	—	0.204+0.081 −0.038	—	15.18725932 ±0.00008158	—	—	2016	
Kepler-1202b	Transit	—	0.262+0.081 −0.028	—	28.6851324 ±0.0001899	—	—	2016	
Kepler-1203b	Transit	—	0.095+0.005 −0.004	—	0.58800076 ±0.00000058	—	—	2016	
Kepler-1204b	Transit	—	0.272+0.078 −0.027	—	85.7350285 ±0.0006373	—	—	2016	
Kepler-1205b	Transit	—	0.126+0.009 −0.008	—	1.07839035 ±0.0000016	—	—	2016	
Kepler-1206b	Transit	—	0.146+0.008 −0.007	—	1.21699766 ±0.00000261	—	—	2016	
Kepler-1207b	Transit	—	0.145+0.045 −0.016	—	13.68237119 ±0.00008986	—	—	2016	
Kepler-1208b	Transit	—	0.207+0.017 −0.012	—	11.08507637 ±0.00005235	—	—	2016	
Kepler-1209b	Transit	—	0.135+0.029 −0.016	—	25.369116 ±0.0001249	—	—	2016	
Kepler-1210b	Transit	—	0.152+0.027 −0.012	—	8.07124073 ±0.00004899	—	—	2016	
Kepler-1211b	Transit	—	0.227±0.037	—	11.01816836 ±0.00007975	—	—	2016	
Kepler-1212b	Transit	—	0.191+0.052 −0.024	—	12.94130146 ±0.0000791	—	—	2016	
Kepler-1213b	Transit	—	0.106+0.012 −0.009	—	5.34982412 ±0.00002659	—	—	2016	
Kepler-1214b	Transit	—	0.211+0.017 −0.01	—	18.82634264 ±0.00008784	—	—	2016	
Kepler-1215b	Transit	—	0.109+0.016 −0.011	—	4.76703963 ±0.000023	—	—	2016	
Kepler-1216b	Transit	—	0.124+0.02 −0.01	—	4.37034536 ±0.00001993	—	—	2016	
Kepler-1217b	Transit	—	0.178+0.043 −0.017	—	2.03232507 ±0.00000646	—	—	2016	
Kepler-1218b	Transit	—	0.128+0.013 −0.012	—	22.9221266 ±0.0002337	—	—	2016	
Kepler-1219b	Transit	—	0.189+0.05 −0.04	—	16.10467749 ±0.00008828	—	—	2016	
Kepler-1220b	Transit	—	0.136+0.029 −0.017	—	7.42693741 ±0.00004187	—	—	2016	
Kepler-1221b	Transit	—	0.168+0.027 −0.014	—	12.00096042 ±0.00005761	—	—	2016	
Kepler-1222b	Transit	—	0.07±0.005	—	1.91694425 ±0.00000611	—	—	2016	
Kepler-1223b	Transit	—	0.109+0.005 −0.007	—	16.301259 ±0.000103	—	—	2016	
Kepler-1224b	Transit	—	0.119+0.011 −0.007	—	13.32351601 ±0.00007281	—	—	2016	
Kepler-1225b	Transit	—	0.162+0.054 −0.021	—	7.01075434 ±0.00002753	—	—	2016	
Kepler-1226b	Transit	—	0.129+0.023 −0.013	—	17.2923453 ±0.0001187	—	—	2016	
Kepler-1227b	Transit	—	0.204+0.046 −0.021	—	94.2887577 ±0.0005873	—	—	2016	
Kepler-1228b	Transit	—	0.137+0.01 −0.012	—	0.57736958 ±0.00000041	—	—	2016	
Kepler-1229b	Transit	—	0.125+0.01 −0.012	—	86.828989 ±0.001069	—	—	2016	
Kepler-1230b	Transit	—	0.242+0.044 −0.026	—	9.95661537 ±0.00004469	—	—	2016	
Kepler-1231b	Transit	—	0.127+0.027 −0.011	—	10.41725184 ±0.00006556	—	—	2016	
Kepler-1232b	Transit	—	0.172+0.021 −0.014	—	26.7839183 ±0.0001786	—	—	2016	
Kepler-1233b	Transit	—	0.232+0.096 −0.035	—	45.1263042 ±0.0005171	—	—	2016	
Kepler-1234b	Transit	—	0.251+0.014 −0.072	—	11.94014029 ±0.00008335	—	—	2016	
Kepler-1235b	Transit	—	0.07+0.011 −0.005	—	4.16055856 ±0.00002789	—	—	2016	
Kepler-1236b	Transit	—	0.191+0.016 −0.02	—	31.0571618 ±0.0002508	—	—	2016	
Kepler-1237b	Transit	—	0.255+0.035 −0.019	—	84.5733226 ±0.000648	—	—	2016	
Kepler-1238b	Transit	—	0.172+0.076 −0.037	—	4.14787559 ±0.00003447	—	—	2016	
Kepler-1239b	Transit	—	0.259+0.033 −0.028	—	5.19104016 ±0.00002643	—	—	2016	
Kepler-1240b	Transit	—	0.103+0.018 −0.009	—	4.8663815 ±0.00002513	—	—	2016	
Kepler-1241b	Transit	—	0.235+0.019 −0.021	—	18.5525701 ±0.0001035	—	—	2016	
Kepler-1242b	Transit	—	0.202±0.012	—	13.62798432 ±0.00005714	—	—	2016	
Kepler-1243b	Transit	—	0.156+0.025 −0.015	—	16.8320729 ±0.00008923	—	—	2016	
Kepler-1244b	Transit	—	0.12+0.056 −0.022	—	3.70428172 ±0.00001784	—	—	2016	
Kepler-1245b	Transit	—	0.128+0.011 −0.009	—	4.35409304 ±0.00001933	—	—	2016	
Kepler-1245c	Transit	—	0.128+0.012 −0.007	—	2.93658468 ±0.0000084	—	—	2016	
Kepler-1246b	Transit	—	0.121+0.018 −0.02	—	11.32271513 ±0.00008852	—	—	2016	
Kepler-1247b	Transit	—	0.208+0.019 −0.014	—	13.71220213 ±0.00006363	—	—	2016	
Kepler-1248b	Transit	—	0.105+0.018 −0.01	—	7.46725407 ±0.00005302	—	—	2016	
Kepler-1249b	Transit	—	0.212+0.087 −0.034	—	24.3347127 ±0.0002886	—	—	2016	
Kepler-1250b	Transit	—	0.171+0.04 −0.015	—	2.60754383 ±0.00000652	—	—	2016	
Kepler-1251b	Transit	—	0.164+0.023 −0.012	—	45.0904643 ±0.000463	—	—	2016	
Kepler-1252b	Transit	—	0.149+0.037 −0.021	—	15.0540329 ±0.0001248	—	—	2016	
Kepler-1253b	Transit	—	0.119±0.016	—	68.8861915 ±0.000527	—	—	2016	
Kepler-1254b	Transit	—	0.138+0.008 −0.011	—	9.99113313 ±0.0000561	—	—	2016	
Kepler-1254c	Transit	—	0.116+0.006 −0.011	—	3.60084276 ±0.000019	—	—	2016	
Kepler-1254d	Transit	—	0.117+0.008 −0.01	—	5.72717226 ±0.00002908	—	—	2016	
Kepler-1255b	Transit	—	0.207+0.057 −0.026	—	36.2919336 ±0.0003156	—	—	2016	
Kepler-1256b	Transit	—	0.133+0.039 −0.02	—	12.4127754 ±0.000108	—	—	2016	
Kepler-1257b	Transit	—	0.136+0.016 −0.011	—	2.66831376 ±0.00000986	—	—	2016	
Kepler-1258b	Transit	—	0.077+0.012 −0.007	—	0.98494017 ±0.00000318	—	—	2016	
Kepler-1259b	Transit	—	0.128+0.006 −0.009	—	0.66308526 ±0.00000087	—	—	2016	
Kepler-1260b	Transit	—	0.158+0.045 −0.025	—	19.1187753 ±0.0001687	—	—	2016	
Kepler-1261b	Transit	—	0.202±0.012	—	48.4308991 ±0.0003144	—	—	2016	
Kepler-1262b	Transit	—	0.162+0.029 −0.015	—	8.67900242 ±0.0000379	—	—	2016	
Kepler-1263b	Transit	—	0.102+0.025 −0.011	—	4.55139967 ±0.00002128	—	—	2016	
Kepler-1264b	Transit	—	0.105+0.02 −0.011	—	0.96852602 ±0.00000233	—	—	2016	
Kepler-1265b	Transit	—	0.12+0.006 −0.012	—	6.49441289 ±0.00002951	—	—	2016	
Kepler-1266b	Transit	—	0.23+0.012 −0.041	—	28.474748 ±0.0002045	—	—	2016	
Kepler-1267b	Transit	—	0.269+0.085 −0.04	—	13.0313945 ±0.0001104	—	—	2016	
Kepler-1268b	Transit	—	0.181+0.06 −0.021	—	40.9903986 ±0.0004806	—	—	2016	
Kepler-1269b	Transit	—	0.145+0.041 −0.016	—	37.3331536 ±0.000321	—	—	2016	
Kepler-1270b	Transit	—	0.296+0.027 −0.058	—	6.03356196 ±0.00006551	—	—	2016	
Kepler-1271b	Transit	—	0.132+0.021 −0.014	—	3.0255955 ±0.0000116	—	—	2016	
Kepler-1272b	Transit	—	0.211+0.062 −0.029	—	51.1309704 ±0.0004514	—	—	2016	
Kepler-1273b	Transit	—	0.222+0.029 −0.017	—	28.625653 ±0.0002174	—	—	2016	
Kepler-1274b	Transit	—	0.127±0.009	—	6.98152703 ±0.00006708	—	—	2016	
Kepler-1275b	Transit	—	0.132+0.058 −0.024	—	3.65691115 ±0.00001583	—	—	2016	
Kepler-1276b	Transit	—	0.106+0.018 −0.01	—	12.5720095 ±0.0001098	—	—	2016	
Kepler-1277b	Transit	—	0.143+0.026 −0.01	—	40.8365012 ±0.0004586	—	—	2016	
Kepler-1278b	Transit	—	0.09+0.028 −0.011	—	3.23941344 ±0.00001696	—	—	2016	
Kepler-1279b	Transit	—	0.156+0.079 −0.024	—	23.4774101 ±0.0002445	—	—	2016	
Kepler-1280b	Transit	—	0.167+0.074 −0.026	—	66.5579057 ±0.0007705	—	—	2016	
Kepler-1281b	Transit	—	0.146±0.012	—	3.11602791 ±0.000013	—	—	2016	
Kepler-1282b	Transit	—	0.138+0.019 −0.01	—	2.13194651 ±0.00000687	—	—	2016	
Kepler-1283b	Transit	—	0.17+0.07 −0.028	—	12.9460978 ±0.0002185	—	—	2016	
Kepler-1284b	Transit	—	0.108+0.009 −0.006	—	0.66407381 ±0.00000148	—	—	2016	
Kepler-1285b	Transit	—	0.087+0.009 −0.007	—	14.7967458 ±0.0001134	—	—	2016	
Kepler-1286b	Transit	—	0.192+0.04 −0.016	—	11.25402929 ±0.00006812	—	—	2016	
Kepler-1287b	Transit	—	0.137+0.02 −0.012	—	11.47685909 ±0.00006466	—	—	2016	
Kepler-1288b	Transit	—	0.1+0.042 −0.014	—	2.76122421 ±0.00001477	—	—	2016	
Kepler-1289b	Transit	—	0.136+0.044 −0.021	—	7.99019627 ±0.00005083	—	—	2016	
Kepler-1290b	Transit	—	0.127+0.019 −0.012	—	4.69500134 ±0.00004206	—	—	2016	
Kepler-1291b	Transit	—	0.148+0.009 −0.016	—	8.63043276 ±0.00006731	—	—	2016	
Kepler-1292b	Transit	—	0.162+0.026 −0.012	—	3.27646405 ±0.00001548	—	—	2016	
Kepler-1293b	Transit	—	0.087+0.037 −0.013	—	5.57654784 ±0.00004024	—	—	2016	
Kepler-1294b	Transit	—	0.285+0.048 −0.028	—	115.6862258 ±0.0008445	—	—	2016	
Kepler-1295b	Transit	—	0.138+0.018 −0.011	—	3.81371974 ±0.00002278	—	—	2016	
Kepler-1296b	Transit	—	0.081+0.008 −0.005	—	8.3839865 ±0.00008648	—	—	2016	
Kepler-1297b	Transit	—	0.087+0.014 −0.008	—	1.68189002 ±0.00001032	—	—	2016	
Kepler-1298b	Transit	—	0.117±0.021	—	7.12811928 ±0.00004863	—	—	2016	
Kepler-1299b	Transit	—	0.266+0.059 −0.037	—	19.9400874 ±0.0001457	—	—	2016	
Kepler-1300b	Transit	—	0.122+0.027 −0.028	—	22.2419092 ±0.0002454	—	—	2016	
Kepler-1301b	Transit	—	0.125+0.012 −0.007	—	9.08237046 ±0.00004331	—	—	2016	
Kepler-1302b	Transit	—	0.128+0.013 −0.008	—	8.83922659 ±0.00005866	—	—	2016	
Kepler-1303b	Transit	—	0.127+0.031 −0.012	—	7.56127224 ±0.0000412	—	—	2016	
Kepler-1304b	Transit	—	0.204+0.017 −0.047	—	16.1288853 ±0.0001191	—	—	2016	
Kepler-1305b	Transit	—	0.168+0.031 −0.017	—	13.5630972 ±0.0001385	—	—	2016	
Kepler-1306b	Transit	—	0.17+0.04 −0.016	—	16.29595382 ±0.00007404	—	—	2016	
Kepler-1307b	Transit	—	0.22+0.059 −0.024	—	18.01621096 ±0.00009522	—	—	2016	
Kepler-1308b	Transit	—	0.046+0.005 −0.004	—	2.10433812 ±0.00000424	—	—	2016	
Kepler-1309b	Transit	—	0.211±0.018	—	28.8432647 ±0.0002652	—	—	2016	
Kepler-1310b	Transit	—	0.128+0.014 −0.011	—	0.67933627 ±0.00000072	—	—	2016	
Kepler-1311b	Transit	—	0.111+0.022 −0.023	—	11.1726994 ±0.0001387	—	—	2016	
Kepler-1311c	Transit	—	0.109+0.025 −0.021	—	2.53573424 ±0.00001018	—	—	2016	
Kepler-1312b	Transit	—	0.187+0.007 −0.006	—	5.44832529 ±0.00000735	—	—	2016	
Kepler-1313b	Transit	—	0.157+0.005 −0.007	—	3.83309118 ±0.00000534	—	—	2016	
Kepler-1314b	Transit	—	0.456±0.017	—	5.42474928 ±0.00000397	—	—	2016	
Kepler-1315b	Transit	—	0.123+0.007 −0.005	—	0.84338011 ±0.00000082	—	—	2016	
Kepler-1316b	Transit	—	0.316+0.049 −0.034	—	87.9732136 ±0.0005231	—	—	2016	
Kepler-1317b	Transit	—	0.139+0.008 −0.007	—	0.56887443 ±0.0000006	—	—	2016	
Kepler-1318b	Transit	—	0.277+0.015 −0.013	—	213.257663 ±0.001051	—	—	2016	
Kepler-1319b	Transit	—	0.12+0.064 −0.007	—	2.88676265 ±0.00000337	—	—	2016	
Kepler-1320b	Transit	—	0.152+0.006 −0.01	—	0.86838653 ±0.00000116	—	—	2016	
Kepler-1321b	Transit	—	0.439±0.054	—	11.12830484 ±0.00002043	—	—	2016	
Kepler-1321c	Transit	—	0.214+0.027 −0.016	—	2.22649109 ±0.00000524	—	—	2016	
Kepler-1322b	Transit	—	0.144+0.018 −0.012	—	0.96286738 ±0.00000204	—	—	2016	
Kepler-1323b	Transit	—	0.136+0.029 −0.021	—	0.92990668 ±0.00000075	—	—	2016	
Kepler-1324b	Transit	—	0.135+0.007 −0.008	—	4.11584468 ±0.00000855	—	—	2016	
Kepler-1325b	Transit	—	0.255+0.036 −0.042	—	33.8786838 ±0.0002334	—	—	2016	
Kepler-1326b	Transit	—	0.373+0.135 −0.068	—	42.3514267 ±0.0001372	—	—	2016	
Kepler-1327b	Transit	—	0.161+0.052 −0.018	—	14.88801098 ±0.00008768	—	—	2016	
Kepler-1328b	Transit	—	0.087+0.018 −0.008	—	4.52158888 ±0.00002184	—	—	2016	
Kepler-1329b	Transit	—	0.194+0.005 −0.014	—	9.33646594 ±0.00003106	—	—	2016	
Kepler-1330b	Transit	—	0.147+0.036 −0.012	—	10.10769068 ±0.00004951	—	—	2016	
Kepler-1331b	Transit	—	0.094+0.008 −0.007	—	0.78916165 ±0.00000121	—	—	2016	
Kepler-1332b	Transit	—	0.122+0.008 −0.004	—	11.87456832 ±0.00003749	—	—	2016	
Kepler-1333b	Transit	—	0.251+0.036 −0.022	—	109.6471842 ±0.0007077	—	—	2016	
Kepler-1334b	Transit	—	0.204+0.028 −0.016	—	15.64591713 ±0.00007265	—	—	2016	
Kepler-1335b	Transit	—	0.129+0.009 −0.008	—	6.26406846 ±0.00002706	—	—	2016	
Kepler-1336b	Transit	—	0.177+0.027 −0.036	—	23.198681 ±0.0002546	—	—	2016	
Kepler-1336c	Transit	—	0.153+0.024 −0.031	—	5.77721211 ±0.00002788	—	—	2016	
Kepler-1337b	Transit	—	0.215+0.009 −0.039	—	24.4002549 ±0.0001089	—	—	2016	
Kepler-1338b	Transit	—	0.082+0.017 −0.009	—	0.93511806 ±0.00000276	—	—	2016	
Kepler-1339b	Transit	—	0.063+0.005 −0.004	—	1.34155513 ±0.0000037	—	—	2016	
Kepler-1340b	Transit	—	0.138+0.062 −0.024	—	0.66502692 ±0.0000016	—	—	2016	
Kepler-1341b	Transit	—	0.267+0.037 −0.033	—	132.9968322 ±0.0009243	—	—	2016	
Kepler-1342b	Transit	—	0.148+0.02 −0.012	—	2.21571036 ±0.00000812	—	—	2016	
Kepler-1343b	Transit	—	0.172+0.022 −0.017	—	3.35183158 ±0.00001113	—	—	2016	
Kepler-1344b	Transit	—	0.164+0.045 −0.018	—	4.7683049 ±0.00001895	—	—	2016	
Kepler-1345b	Transit	—	0.211+0.095 −0.041	—	44.6169557 ±0.0003329	—	—	2016	
Kepler-1346b	Transit	—	0.141+0.05 −0.019	—	3.40165668 ±0.00001161	—	—	2016	
Kepler-1347b	Transit	—	0.092+0.005 −0.004	—	14.00947528 ±0.00007001	—	—	2016	
Kepler-1348b	Transit	—	0.173+0.038 −0.021	—	27.5722742 ±0.000228	—	—	2016	
Kepler-1349b	Transit	—	0.062+0.056 −0.01	—	2.12823928 ±0.00001057	—	—	2016	
Kepler-1350b	Transit	—	0.225+0.014 −0.022	—	4.4968604 ±0.00001273	—	—	2016	
Kepler-1350c	Transit	—	0.154+0.011 −0.016	—	1.76678906 ±0.00000712	—	—	2016	
Kepler-1351b	Transit	—	0.058±0.004	—	0.91614077 ±0.00000192	—	—	2016	
Kepler-1352b	Transit	—	0.079+0.022 −0.01	—	1.87788275 ±0.00000735	—	—	2016	
Kepler-1353b	Transit	—	0.161+0.033 −0.012	—	24.7543966 ±0.0001431	—	—	2016	
Kepler-1354b	Transit	—	0.265+0.109 −0.045	—	76.613377 ±0.0007773	—	—	2016	
Kepler-1355b	Transit	—	0.13+0.011 −0.009	—	1.28958811 ±0.0000035	—	—	2016	
Kepler-1356b	Transit	—	0.136+0.01 −0.009	—	0.63400294 ±0.0000012	—	—	2016	
Kepler-1357b	Transit	—	0.114+0.018 −0.01	—	3.0091324 ±0.0000152	—	—	2016	
Kepler-1358b	Transit	—	0.1+0.006 −0.009	—	7.06317341 ±0.000029	—	—	2016	
Kepler-1359b	Transit	—	0.252+0.04 −0.029	—	59.4970952 ±0.0005052	—	—	2016	
Kepler-1360b	Transit	—	0.303+0.104 −0.068	—	40.5286413 ±0.0003328	—	—	2016	
Kepler-1361b	Transit	—	0.077±0.011	—	3.57554956 ±0.00002329	—	—	2016	
Kepler-1362b	Transit	—	0.232+0.011 −0.017	—	136.205626 ±0.001278	—	—	2016	
Kepler-1363b	Transit	—	0.112+0.008 −0.007	—	2.94194094 ±0.00001171	—	—	2016	
Kepler-1364b	Transit	—	0.192+0.071 −0.035	—	13.32196237 ±0.00008114	—	—	2016	
Kepler-1365b	Transit	—	0.082+0.012 −0.009	—	7.69993485 ±0.00004726	—	—	2016	
Kepler-1365c	Transit	—	0.071+0.011 −0.007	—	4.77468005 ±0.00004014	—	—	2016	
Kepler-1366b	Transit	—	0.128±0.009	—	2.16457097 ±0.00000683	—	—	2016	
Kepler-1367b	Transit	—	0.082+0.006 −0.007	—	1.57409027 ±0.00000524	—	—	2016	
Kepler-1368b	Transit	—	0.147+0.031 −0.015	—	0.67564949 ±0.00000255	—	—	2016	
Kepler-1369b	Transit	—	0.24+0.037 −0.022	—	25.873148 ±0.0001453	—	—	2016	
Kepler-1370b	Transit	—	0.164+0.059 −0.023	—	20.2641684 ±0.0001111	—	—	2016	
Kepler-1370c	Transit	—	0.113+0.05 −0.016	—	7.44142113 ±0.00005404	—	—	2016	
Kepler-1371b	Transit	—	0.065+0.007 −0.004	—	3.4462039 ±0.00002017	—	—	2016	
Kepler-1371c	Transit	—	0.057+0.006 −0.004	—	2.00541269 ±0.00001065	—	—	2016	
Kepler-1372b	Transit	—	0.113+0.039 −0.012	—	1.31155557 ±0.00000554	—	—	2016	
Kepler-1373b	Transit	—	0.103+0.048 −0.017	—	1.29123275 ±0.00000646	—	—	2016	
Kepler-1374b	Transit	—	0.204+0.018 −0.016	—	10.65276707 ±0.00005294	—	—	2016	
Kepler-1375b	Transit	—	0.155+0.061 −0.03	—	3.3004192 ±0.00001505	—	—	2016	
Kepler-1376b	Transit	—	0.094+0.019 −0.008	—	5.30880656 ±0.00004525	—	—	2016	
Kepler-1377b	Transit	—	0.112+0.008 −0.007	—	0.74092842 ±0.00000185	—	—	2016	
Kepler-1378b	Transit	—	0.196+0.063 −0.012	—	11.95398936 ±0.0000799	—	—	2016	
Kepler-1379b	Transit	—	0.116+0.011 −0.008	—	0.88184115 ±0.00000313	—	—	2016	
Kepler-1380b	Transit	—	0.128+0.023 −0.01	—	10.3108245 ±0.0001042	—	—	2016	
Kepler-1381b	Transit	—	0.201+0.026 −0.017	—	25.3842686 ±0.0001757	—	—	2016	
Kepler-1382b	Transit	—	0.168+0.035 −0.03	—	16.3583055 ±0.0001024	—	—	2016	
Kepler-1383b	Transit	—	0.126+0.056 −0.026	—	13.9093583 ±0.0001552	—	—	2016	
Kepler-1384b	Transit	—	0.173+0.038 −0.018	—	15.36262753 ±0.00008765	—	—	2016	
Kepler-1385b	Transit	—	0.076+0.018 −0.012	—	2.88879862 ±0.00001881	—	—	2016	
Kepler-1386b	Transit	—	0.111+0.034 −0.012	—	6.73972381 ±0.00007022	—	—	2016	
Kepler-1387b	Transit	—	0.083+0.004 −0.008	—	2.27952666 ±0.00000885	—	—	2016	
Kepler-1388b	Transit	—	0.231±0.012	—	12.2854603 ±0.00008795	—	—	2016	
Kepler-1388c	Transit	—	0.202+0.012 −0.01	—	5.53608151 ±0.0000288	—	—	2016	
Kepler-1388d	Transit	—	0.255+0.011 −0.017	—	20.9568158 ±0.0001713	—	—	2016	
Kepler-1388e	Transit	—	0.219+0.012 −0.013	—	37.6327084 ±0.0007269	—	—	2016	
Kepler-1389b	Transit	—	0.158+0.004 −0.012	—	99.2530951 ±0.0008711	—	—	2016	
Kepler-1390b	Transit	—	0.105+0.022 −0.012	—	6.48021673 ±0.0000463	—	—	2016	
Kepler-1391b	Transit	—	0.15+0.023 −0.016	—	54.4092333 ±0.0005236	—	—	2016	
Kepler-1392b	Transit	—	0.175+0.02 −0.014	—	15.1410397 ±0.0001135	—	—	2016	
Kepler-1393b	Transit	—	0.071+0.004 −0.007	—	2.44357812 ±0.00001231	—	—	2016	
Kepler-1394b	Transit	—	0.124+0.018 −0.02	—	3.93766373 ±0.00003657	—	—	2016	
Kepler-1395b	Transit	—	0.071+0.008 −0.005	—	3.78470649 ±0.0000272	—	—	2016	
Kepler-1396b	Transit	—	0.185+0.07 −0.033	—	18.2206421 ±0.0001376	—	—	2016	
Kepler-1397b	Transit	—	0.153+0.017 −0.012	—	47.449955 ±0.000752	—	—	2016	
Kepler-1398b	Transit	—	0.08+0.025 −0.011	—	2.78815679 ±0.00002021	—	—	2016	
Kepler-1398c	Transit	—	0.092+0.033 −0.013	—	4.13827595 ±0.00002616	—	—	2016	
Kepler-1399b	Transit	—	0.112+0.02 −0.01	—	1.63865306 ±0.00000895	—	—	2016	
Kepler-1400b	Transit	—	0.145±0.01	—	9.06689421 ±0.00006982	—	—	2016	
Kepler-1401b	Transit	—	0.15+0.033 −0.016	—	11.20066445 ±0.00008804	—	—	2016	
Kepler-1402b	Transit	—	0.068+0.007 −0.006	—	2.03387914 ±0.00001415	—	—	2016	
Kepler-1403b	Transit	—	0.191+0.048 −0.023	—	5.19492202 ±0.00002801	—	—	2016	
Kepler-1404b	Transit	—	0.179+0.012 −0.019	—	15.9314739 ±0.0001133	—	—	2016	
Kepler-1405b	Transit	—	0.353+0.079 −0.04	—	28.2274184 ±0.0001392	—	—	2016	
Kepler-1406b	Transit	—	0.098+0.016 −0.012	—	11.62905828 ±0.00006904	—	—	2016	
Kepler-1407b	Transit	—	0.201+0.047 −0.029	—	20.0711504 ±0.0005453	—	—	2016	
Kepler-1408b	Transit	—	0.079+6.148 −0.013	—	2.99793191 ±0.00002517	—	—	2016	
Kepler-1409b	Transit	—	0.093+0.007 −0.006	—	0.76486493 ±0.0000024	—	—	2016	
Kepler-1410b	Transit	—	0.159+0.011 −0.012	—	60.866168 ±0.0005161	—	—	2016	
Kepler-1411b	Transit	—	0.252+0.038 −0.021	—	86.1150888 ±0.0009728	—	—	2016	
Kepler-1412b	Transit	—	0.074+0.013 −0.012	—	3.6146051 ±0.00002139	—	—	2016	
Kepler-1413b	Transit	—	0.162+0.014 −0.013	—	13.1829642 ±0.0001082	—	—	2016	
Kepler-1414b	Transit	—	0.11+0.008 −0.007	—	3.51576315 ±0.00001186	—	—	2016	
Kepler-1415b	Transit	—	0.115+0.011 −0.007	—	0.63642408 ±0.0000016	—	—	2016	
Kepler-1416b	Transit	—	0.079+0.029 −0.012	—	1.49514952 ±0.00001069	—	—	2016	
Kepler-1417b	Transit	—	0.089+0.018 −0.01	—	20.3505213 ±0.0003037	—	—	2016	
Kepler-1418b	Transit	—	0.148+0.007 −0.012	—	22.4764425 ±0.0001747	—	—	2016	
Kepler-1419b	Transit	—	0.255+0.059 −0.026	—	42.5215895 ±0.0005032	—	—	2016	
Kepler-1420b	Transit	—	0.114+0.012 −0.011	—	6.69960006 ±0.000045	—	—	2016	
Kepler-1421b	Transit	—	0.083+0.018 −0.01	—	6.9131112 ±0.00014	—	—	2016	
Kepler-1422b	Transit	—	0.18+0.037 −0.024	—	18.6051942 ±0.0003246	—	—	2016	
Kepler-1423b	Transit	—	0.095+0.008 −0.006	—	23.955378 ±0.0001729	—	—	2016	
Kepler-1424b	Transit	—	0.103+0.014 −0.011	—	29.6091744 ±0.0003002	—	—	2016	
Kepler-1425b	Transit	—	0.084+0.017 −0.012	—	14.4541302 ±0.0001621	—	—	2016	
Kepler-1426b	Transit	—	0.139+0.029 −0.015	—	14.2563227 ±0.000194	—	—	2016	
Kepler-1427b	Transit	—	0.098+0.021 −0.011	—	0.96897238 ±0.00000677	—	—	2016	
Kepler-1428b	Transit	—	0.146+0.012 −0.009	—	10.67607169 ±0.00006093	—	—	2016	
Kepler-1429b	Transit	—	0.115+0.031 −0.012	—	4.48487493 ±0.00004558	—	—	2016	
Kepler-1430b	Transit	—	0.105+0.008 −0.007	—	2.46050993 ±0.00001273	—	—	2016	
Kepler-1431b	Transit	—	0.131+0.037 −0.014	—	5.86601526 ±0.00004724	—	—	2016	
Kepler-1432b	Transit	—	0.198+0.062 −0.027	—	23.9109011 ±0.0002703	—	—	2016	
Kepler-1433b	Transit	—	0.139+0.04 −0.016	—	4.13592271 ±0.00002888	—	—	2016	
Kepler-1434b	Transit	—	0.099+0.019 −0.018	—	8.05333618 ±0.00008907	—	—	2016	
Kepler-1435b	Transit	—	0.077+0.011 −0.008	—	4.45343281 ±0.00003591	—	—	2016	
Kepler-1436b	Transit	—	0.117+0.031 −0.016	—	9.705716 ±0.0001638	—	—	2016	
Kepler-1437b	Transit	—	0.122+0.015 −0.012	—	10.9295461 ±0.0001172	—	—	2016	
Kepler-1438b	Transit	—	0.084+0.017 −0.009	—	2.31942009 ±0.00001702	—	—	2016	
Kepler-1439b	Transit	—	0.13+0.012 −0.019	—	8.07392849 ±0.00004784	—	—	2016	
Kepler-1440b	Transit	—	0.112+0.021 −0.012	—	39.859484 ±0.001034	—	—	2016	
Kepler-1441b	Transit	—	0.117+0.02 −0.012	—	39.4419839 ±0.0005327	—	—	2016	
Kepler-1442b	Transit	—	0.351+0.037 −0.026	—	81.4162941 ±0.0002026	—	—	2016	
Kepler-1443b	Transit	—	0.087+0.02 −0.008	—	2.41811321 ±0.00001443	—	—	2016	
Kepler-1444b	Transit	—	0.194+0.037 −0.017	—	33.42035034 ±0.00009305	—	—	2016	
Kepler-1445b	Transit	—	0.086+0.018 −0.012	—	10.60052251 ±0.00009265	—	—	2016	
Kepler-1446b	Transit	—	0.073+0.004 −0.002	—	0.68996783 ±0.0000005	—	—	2016	
Kepler-1447b	Transit	—	0.259+0.045 −0.021	—	56.6747285 ±0.0003978	—	—	2016	
Kepler-1448b	Transit	—	0.144+0.019 −0.014	—	12.27065865 ±0.00005885	—	—	2016	
Kepler-1449b	Transit	—	0.15+0.033 −0.016	—	13.2274528 ±0.0001447	—	—	2016	
Kepler-1450b	Transit	—	0.153+0.012 −0.01	—	54.5094166 ±0.000527	—	—	2016	
Kepler-1451b	Transit	—	0.299+0.055 −0.059	—	35.622233 ±0.0002098	—	—	2016	
Kepler-1452b	Transit	—	0.241+0.035 −0.031	—	42.913751 ±0.0003689	—	—	2016	
Kepler-1453b	Transit	—	0.238+0.039 −0.019	—	47.1611696 ±0.0004176	—	—	2016	
Kepler-1454b	Transit	—	0.168+0.017 −0.015	—	47.0319479 ±0.0006695	—	—	2016	
Kepler-1455b	Transit	—	0.193+0.013 −0.014	—	49.276764 ±0.0003737	—	—	2016	
Kepler-1456b	Transit	—	0.102+0.008 −0.013	—	18.1373829 ±0.0001854	—	—	2016	
Kepler-1457b	Transit	—	0.178+0.028 −0.018	—	51.1110243 ±0.0003738	—	—	2016	
Kepler-1458b	Transit	—	0.246+0.037 −0.019	—	47.9872764 ±0.0001776	—	—	2016	
Kepler-1459b	Transit	—	0.121+0.009 −0.007	—	62.8691611 ±0.0009586	—	—	2016	
Kepler-1460b	Transit	—	0.175±0.012	—	29.9633247 ±0.0002186	—	—	2016	
Kepler-1461b	Transit	—	0.181+0.008 −0.014	—	29.3494775 ±0.0001832	—	—	2016	
Kepler-1462b	Transit	—	0.341+0.073 −0.035	—	65.6488341 ±0.0006621	—	—	2016	
Kepler-1463b	Transit	—	0.166+0.029 −0.017	—	25.15864 ±0.0005123	—	—	2016	
Kepler-1464b	Transit	—	0.148+0.026 −0.014	—	31.7785901 ±0.0002734	—	—	2016	
Kepler-1464c	Transit	—	0.089+0.02 −0.01	—	5.32786292 ±0.00005389	—	—	2016	
Kepler-1465b	Transit	—	0.158+0.031 −0.017	—	31.8277111 ±0.0001219	—	—	2016	
Kepler-1466b	Transit	—	0.138+0.024 −0.015	—	31.1750448 ±0.0002157	—	—	2016	
Kepler-1467b	Transit	—	0.294+0.028 −0.022	—	47.0569043 ±0.0001835	—	—	2016	
Kepler-1468b	Transit	—	0.154+0.037 −0.017	—	8.23984869 ±0.00003988	—	—	2016	
Kepler-1468c	Transit	—	0.103+0.022 −0.012	—	3.54553021 ±0.00002273	—	—	2016	
Kepler-1469b	Transit	—	0.25+0.033 −0.023	—	21.8635301 ±0.0001219	—	—	2016	
Kepler-1470b	Transit	—	0.095+0.008 −0.007	—	16.2950903 ±0.0001916	—	—	2016	
Kepler-1471b	Transit	—	0.126+0.018 −0.012	—	3.63899398 ±0.00002002	—	—	2016	
Kepler-1472b	Transit	—	0.17+0.068 −0.032	—	38.1312831 ±0.0005755	—	—	2016	
Kepler-1473b	Transit	—	0.106+0.008 −0.007	—	14.4273551 ±0.00008414	—	—	2016	
Kepler-1474b	Transit	—	0.193+0.039 −0.021	—	36.4333452 ±0.0003218	—	—	2016	
Kepler-1475b	Transit	—	0.261+0.088 −0.041	—	82.177374 ±0.00115	—	—	2016	
Kepler-1476b	Transit	—	0.149+0.033 −0.012	—	10.35863224 ±0.00005885	—	—	2016	
Kepler-1477b	Transit	—	0.105±0.008	—	11.55530021 ±0.00008098	—	—	2016	
Kepler-1478b	Transit	—	0.154+0.042 −0.017	—	26.0840594 ±0.0005121	—	—	2016	
Kepler-1479b	Transit	—	0.163+0.027 −0.014	—	14.53261362 ±0.00004429	—	—	2016	
Kepler-1480b	Transit	—	0.149+0.01 −0.007	—	22.12679948 ±0.00009372	—	—	2016	
Kepler-1481b	Transit	—	0.11+0.007 −0.005	—	5.94220998 ±0.00002335	—	—	2016	
Kepler-1482b	Transit	—	0.09+0.009 −0.01	—	12.25383217 ±0.00008407	—	—	2016	
Kepler-1483b	Transit	—	0.136+0.059 −0.027	—	9.5085156 ±0.0001053	—	—	2016	
Kepler-1484b	Transit	—	0.188+0.027 −0.02	—	30.4549136 ±0.0003536	—	—	2016	
Kepler-1485b	Transit	—	0.131+0.021 −0.012	—	19.9157725 ±0.0001284	—	—	2016	
Kepler-1486b	Transit	—	0.207+0.052 −0.026	—	54.6495759 ±0.0009825	—	—	2016	
Kepler-1487b	Transit	—	0.19+0.076 −0.04	—	7.31946363 ±0.00004683	—	—	2016	
Kepler-1488b	Transit	—	0.166+0.037 −0.033	—	39.8189932 ±0.0002907	—	—	2016	
Kepler-1489b	Transit	—	0.158+0.021 −0.016	—	82.294751 ±0.001799	—	—	2016	
Kepler-1489c	Transit	—	0.045±0.007	—	0.680741±0.000004	—	—	2024	
Kepler-1490b	Transit	—	0.271+0.033 −0.056	—	92.4362973 ±0.0009042	—	—	2016	
Kepler-1491b	Transit	—	0.135+0.031 −0.012	—	16.5861762 ±0.0002214	—	—	2016	
Kepler-1492b	Transit	—	0.133+0.025 −0.014	—	16.75255007 ±0.0000646	—	—	2016	
Kepler-1493b	Transit	—	0.126+0.024 −0.021	—	15.0217983 ±0.0001075	—	—	2016	
Kepler-1494b	Transit	—	0.274+0.041 −0.051	—	91.080482 ±0.001769	—	—	2016	
Kepler-1495b	Transit	—	0.262+0.064 −0.029	—	85.273256 ±0.001954	—	—	2016	
Kepler-1496b	Transit	—	0.198+0.081 −0.032	—	64.6588017 ±0.00078	—	—	2016	
Kepler-1497b	Transit	—	0.148+0.026 −0.014	—	8.74199772 ±0.00008621	—	—	2016	
Kepler-1498b	Transit	—	0.119+0.01 −0.008	—	48.051405 ±0.0009331	—	—	2016	
Kepler-1499b	Transit	—	0.106+0.022 −0.012	—	44.2008 ±0.0006553	—	—	2016	
Kepler-1500b	Transit	—	0.107+0.02 −0.013	—	15.0330105 ±0.0001612	—	—	2016	
Planet	Discovery method	Mass (M_{J})	Radius (R_{J})	Density (g/cm^{3})	Orbital period (days)	Semimajor axis (AU)	Orbital eccentricity	Year of confirmation	Ref.

back to top
