= List of exoplanets discovered by the Kepler space telescope: 2001–2500 =

This is a partial list of exoplanets discovered by the Kepler space telescope, running from star number 2001 through 2500, inclusive.

Table keys
Planet type
Circumbinary planet
Planet orbits a single star in a multiple star system
Planet has a circumbinary orbit in a system with more than 2 stars
Planet discovered by Kepler community
Potentially habitable
None of the above

== Table ==
Planet	Discovery method	Mass (M_{J})	Radius (R_{J})	Density (g/cm^{3})	Orbital period (days)	Semimajor axis (AU)	Orbital eccentricity	Year of confirmation	Ref.
Earth (for reference)		0.00315	0.0892	5.515	365.2563	1	0.0167	—	
Kepler-2001b	Transit	—	0.093+0.012 −0.007	—	1.090011003±0.000005822	0.0197	—	2023	
Kepler-2001c	Transit	—	0.162+0.021 −0.012	—	14.092583189	0.1084	—	2023	
Kepler-2002b (KOI-2513.01)	Transit	—	0.250+2.000 −0.001	—	19.00547±0.00005	0.5+0.2 −0.4	—	2023	
Kepler-2003b (KOI-4978.01)	Transit	—	0.06±0.01	—	0.941967±0.000003	—	—	2024	
(KOI-134b)	Transit	1.09+0.12 −0.08	1.074±0.017	—	62.1277+0.0045 −0.0057	0.363+0.011 −0.013	0.16+0.02 −0.03	2025	
(KOI-134c)	Transit Timing Variation	0.220+0.017 −0.021	—	—	33.950+0.013 −0.020	0.2305+0.0069 −0.0081	0.24+0.12 −0.03	2025	
Planet	Discovery method	Mass (M_{J})	Radius (R_{J})	Density (g/cm^{3})	Orbital period (days)	Semimajor axis (AU)	Orbital eccentricity	Year of confirmation	Ref.

back to top
