= List of exomoon candidates =

As of 2026, there have been no positive confirmations of satellites of extra-solar planets (exomoons); however, some evidence in favour of their existence has been produced.

== Timeline ==
- 2012 — It has been surmised that J1407b, a possibly planetary-mass object that eclipsed the star V1400 Centauri (aka. J1407) in 2007, may have a few moons based on gaps observed in its circumstellar disk or ring system. Later studies have since found that J1407b is most likely a free-floating sub-brown dwarf or rogue planet, possibly less than 6 Jupiter masses.
- 2012 — The confirmed hot Jupiter planet WASP-12b may also possess a moon.
- December 2013, April 2014 — A candidate exomoon of a free-floating planet MOA-2011-BLG-262L, was announced, but due to degeneracies in the modelling of the microlensing event, the observations can also be explained as a Neptune-mass planet orbiting a low-mass red dwarf, a scenario the authors consider to be more likely. In 2024 the latter scenario was confirmed.
- October 2018 — researchers using the Hubble Space Telescope published observations of the candidate exomoon Kepler-1625b I, which suggest that the host planet is likely several Jupiter masses, while the exomoon may have a mass and radius similar to Neptune. The study concluded that the exomoon hypothesis is the simplest and best explanation for the available observations, though warned that it is difficult to assign a precise probability to its existence and nature.
  - April 2019 — reanalysis concluded that the data was fit better by a planet-only model. According to this study, the discrepancy was an artifact of the data reduction, and Kepler-1625b I likely does not exist.
- September 2019 – A hypothesis involving potential transits of large exomoons being detached from their planets (see ploonet) was posited to explain the light flux-variations of the Tabby's Star, which were identified from the data collected by Kepler space telescope.
- August 2020 — A paper by Chris Fox and Paul Wiegert examined the Kepler dataset for indications of exomoons solely from transit timing variations. Eight candidate signals were found that were consistent with an exomoon, however the signals could also be explained by the presence of another planet. Fox and Wiegert's conclusion was more and higher quality transit timing data would be required to establish whether these are truly moons or not. David Kipping re-derived the timings of six of the eight targets (based on a pre-peer review version) and evaluated the TTV evidence as uncompelling. The same study finds that Kepler-1625b I remains an exomoon candidate.
- August 2021 — astronomers reported an habitable-zone 1.7 R_{🜨} exomoon candidate transiting one of the components in the planetary-mass binary 2MASS J1119-1137AB.
- January 2022 — an exomoon candidate was reported around the planet Kepler-1708b, and because it is orbiting a planet at approximately 1.6 AU from a star that is slightly more luminous than the Sun, it too could be within the habitable zone. However, this candidate is based on limited observations (only two transits) and some consider the data to be non-convincing.
- November 2022 — another exomoon candidate was reported around the planet Kepler-1513b (KOI-3678.01). Unlike the previous giant exomoon candidates of Kepler-1625 and Kepler-1708, this exomoon would be terrestrial-mass, ranging from 0.76 Lunar masses to 0.34 Earth masses depending on the planet's mass and moon's orbital period.
  - October 2023 — a follow-up study by the same team found that the observed TTVs are caused by a second planet in the system, and not by a moon.
- December 2023 — The exomoon candidate around Kepler-1625b was again challenged, along with the Kepler-1708b candidate. This study argues that the statistical significance of these exomoon candidates is lower than previously claimed (with false positive probabilities of 10.9% and 1.6%, respectively) and that true giant exomoons would have stronger evidence. Evidence for exomoon transits may be caused by stellar activity in the Kepler light curves. Kipping's team published a response arguing that these exomoon candidates remain possible.
- October 2024 — New measurements with the Very Large Telescope of the star WASP-49 gave more evidences favoring the presence of a possible volcanically active-moon around the hot Jupiter WASP-49b.
  - A similar study in 2025 with JWST suggested that the sulfur dioxide detection in the atmosphere of WASP-39b is due to the presence of a volcanically active-exomoon.
- 2025 — While investigating HD 206893 B with the GRAVITY instrument at the Very Large Telescope (VLT), signs of a potential very massive exomoon was detected around HD 206893 B. If confirmed, the exomoon's mass should be 40% of Jupiter's mass.
- July 2026 — The European Southern Observatory's Very Large Telescope reported evidence of a possible exomoon-like object orbiting the brown dwarf CD-35 2722 B in the CD-35 2722 system, in a study published in the Nature journal.

== Table ==
Host star of the host planet(s)	Planet designation	Planet mass	Planet semimajor axis (AU)	Exomoon semimajor axis	Exomoon mass (M_{🜨})	Notes
N/A	J1407b	<6 M_{J}	N/A	0.396–0.421 AU	<0.8	One possible exomoon residing in a 4 million km-wide gap in J1407b's circumplanetary disk. Other ring gaps in J1407b's disk may also contain exomoons. J1407b may not actually exist and might just be a large dust cloud.
N/A	2MASS J1119-1137A or B	3.7 M_{J}	3.6 ± 0.9 separation from each other	0.004 - 0.009 AU	0.5 - 1	Found using the transit method. A habitable-zone exomoon candidate transiting a directly imaged free-floating planet or isolated planetary-mass object.
N/A	2MASS J2117-2940	7 M_{J}	N/A	0.005 AU	~0.5	Candidate exomoon transit detected in Spitzer observations of 2MASS J21171431-2940034.
DH Tauri	DH Tauri b	10.6 M_{J}	330	10 AU	317.827	Candidate Jupiter-mass satellite from direct imaging. If confirmed, it could also be considered a planet orbiting a brown dwarf.
HD 189733	HD 189733 b	1.13 M_{J}	0.031	0.0087 AU	?	Found by studying periodic increases and decreases in light given off from HD 189733 b. Outside of planet's Hill sphere.
HD 189733	HD 189733 b	1.13 M_{J}	0.031	<0.00112 AU	~ 0.015	Exo-Io candidate; The sodium and potassium data at HD 189733b is consistent with evaporating exomoons and/or their corresponding gas torus.
Kepler-409	Kepler-409b	1.00 M_{🜨}	0.320	0.222 R_{Hill}	0.300	Possible exomoon from transit timing variations, since deemed unlikely.
Kepler-517	Kepler-517b	7.59 M_{🜨}	0.298	0.278 R_{Hill}	0.499	Possible exomoon from transit timing variations, since deemed unlikely.
Kepler-809	Kepler-809b	38.02 M_{🜨}	0.308	0.289 R_{Hill}	2.931	Possible exomoon from transit timing variations.
Kepler-857	Kepler-857b	14.13 M_{🜨}	0.376	0.208 R_{Hill}	1.636	Possible exomoon from transit timing variations.
Kepler-1000	Kepler-1000b	19.95 M_{🜨}	0.534	0.235 R_{Hill}	1.551	Possible exomoon from transit timing variations, since deemed unlikely.
Kepler-1326	Kepler-1326b	24.55 M_{🜨}	0.2691	0.295 R_{Hill}	6.057	Possible exomoon from transit timing variations, since deemed unlikely.
Kepler-1442	Kepler-1442b	14.13 M_{🜨}	0.405	0.208 R_{Hill}	1.586	Possible exomoon from transit timing variations, since deemed unlikely.
Kepler-1625	Kepler-1625b	<11.6 M_{J}	0.98	0.022 AU	19.0	Name: Kepler-1625b I. Possible Neptune-sized exomoon or double planet, indicated by transit observations.
Kepler-1708	Kepler-1708b	<4.6 M_{J}	1.64	0.005 AU (11.7 R_{P})	<37	Name: Kepler-1708b Possible Neptune-sized exomoon or double planet, indicated by transit observations.
KOI-868	KOI-868.01	0.689 M_{J}	0.6534	0.0221 AU	0.31	Possible exomoon from transit timing variations. Potentially habitable exomoon with a radius of 1.23 R_{🜨}.
KOI-268	KOI-268.01	9.33 M_{🜨}	0.47	0.217 R_{Hill}	0.817	Possible exomoon from transit timing variations, since deemed unlikely.
N/A	MOA-2015-BLG-337L	9.85 M_{J}	N/A	0.24 AU	33.7	Found by microlensing; however it is unknown if the system is a super-Neptune-mass planet orbiting a free-floating planet, or a binary brown dwarf system.
WASP-12	WASP-12b	1.465 M_{J}	0.0232	–	6.4 (radius)	
WASP-12	WASP-12b	1.465 M_{J}	0.0232	6 R_{P}	–	Found by studying periodic increases and decreases in light given off from WASP-12b. Outside of planet's Hill sphere.
WASP-39	WASP-39b	0.275 M_{J}	0.0486	–	~ 0.015	
WASP-49	WASP-49b	0.37 M_{J}	0.0379	< 1.74 R_{P}	~ 0.015	Exo-Io candidate; The sodium exosphere around WASP-49b could be due to a volcanically active Io-like exomoon.
WASP-76	WASP-76b	0.92 M_{J}	0.033	1.125 R_{P}	~ 0.015	Exo-Io candidate; Sodium detected via absorption spectroscopy around WASP-76b is consistent with an extrasolar toroidal atmosphere generated by an evaporating exomoon.
WASP-121	WASP-121b	1.184 M_{J}	0.02544	~ 1.9 R_{P}	~ 0.015	Exo-Io candidate; The sodium detected via absorption spectroscopy around WASP-121b is consistent with an extrasolar gas torus possibly fueled by a hidden exo-Io.
HD 206893	HD 206893 B	19.5+1.4 −1.3 M_{J}	10.75±0.08	~ 0.22 AU	~ 130	Very large mass (around 40% of Jupiter's mass).
CD-35 2722	CD-35 2722 B	29.5+5.1 −4.3 M_{J}	101+15 −14	0.200+0.001 −0.004 AU	≥ 291.765+3.496 −14.302 (≥ 0.918+0.011 −0.045 M_{J})	First unambiguous exosatellite or exomoon candidate detected, though it is uncertain whether this exosatellite would fulfil the presently undefined criteria for qualifying as an exomoon given that CD-35 2722 B is likely to be a brown dwarf based on its mass and the exosatellite is massive enough to be a planet.

== See also ==
- Exomoon
- Exoplanet
- Star
- Lists of stars
- Lists of exoplanets
