= 2MASS J11193254−1137466 =

Planetary mass binary in the constellation Crater

2MASS J11193254–1137466 A
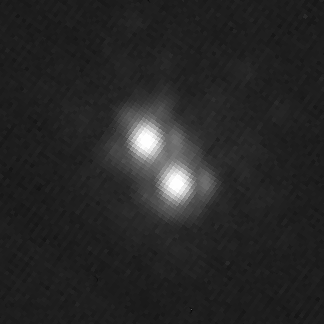
- 2MASS J1119−1137A (upper left) and 2MASS J1119−1137B (lower right); Credit: Keck Observatory; Best et al. Processing: Melina Thévenot

Observation data Epoch J2000 Equinox ICRS
- Constellation: Crater
- Right ascension: 11^{h} 19^{m} 32.543^{s}
- Declination: −11° 37′ 46.70″

Characteristics
- Evolutionary stage: Sub-brown dwarf
- Spectral type: L7
- Apparent magnitude (H): 15.61±0.14
- Apparent magnitude (K): 14.62±0.11

Details
Mass	~5-10 M_{Jup}
Luminosity (bolometric)	0.00004 (total luminosity) L_{☉}

Other designations
- WISE J111932.43-113747.7, TWA 42, TIC 453454626

Database references
SIMBAD	data

2MASS J11193254–1137466 B
Discovery
- Discovery date: 2016
- Detection method: Imaging

Designations
- Alternative names: WISE J111932.43-113747.7, 2MASS J11193254-1137466

Orbital characteristics
- Semi-major axis: 3.6 ± 0.9 AU
- Orbital period (sidereal): 90+80 −50 years

Physical characteristics
- Mass: ~5–10 M_{J}
- Spectral type: L7

2MASS J11193254–1137466 AB (often shortened to 2MASS J1119–1137 AB) is a planetary mass binary located 86±23 light-years from the Earth in the constellation Crater. The components of 2MASS J1119–1137 are each roughly four Jupiter masses. The planetary-mass objects are probably a part of the TW Hydrae association which has an age of approximately 10 million years. The planetary-mass objects are candidate rogue planets.

== Overview ==
The object was found by a team of scientists from Canada, the United States and Chile during a search for unusually red brown dwarfs (such color indicates some notable properties of their atmospheres, e.g. dustiness). The search used data of 3 surveys: SDSS (visible light data), 2MASS (near-infrared) and WISE (mid-wave infrared). 2MASS J1119–1137 was one of the reddest and, according to the authors, the most interesting object found. Results of the work were published in December 2015.

In April 2016, the first detailed study of the object was published. The investigators conducted its infrared spectroscopy on the telescope Gemini South. Radial velocity and proper motion were also calculated. The astronomers determined low surface gravity and moderate age of 2MASS J1119–1137.

In November 2016 and March 2017, 2MASS J1119–1137 was imaged by the telescope Keck II with adaptive optics technique, which revealed its binarity. The angular separation of components is 0.13788 ± 0.00034 arcseconds (which corresponds to linear projected separation 3.6 ± 0.9 AU). Their stellar magnitudes are roughly equal. Total mass of the system is estimated as 7.4^{+2.5}_{−1.9} Jupiter masses. Their total bolometric luminosity is approximately 0.00004 solar units. The estimated orbital period is 90^{+80}_{−50} years.

One of the components of the binary is rotating rapidly, having a period of 3.02^{+0.04}_{−0.03} hours while the typical rotation period for young brown dwarfs is 10 hours.

== Candidate exomoon ==
In August 2021, researchers reported signs of a 1.7 R_{🜨} exomoon (a moon orbiting a planetary-mass object outside the Solar System) transiting one of the components in 2MASS J1119–1137. A possible single transit of the moon candidate was detected in archival Spitzer Space Telescope data. The study determined that the detected event might have been caused by variability (clouds/weather) in the host planet's atmosphere, but that an exomoon was a better fit to the observed data suggesting that the detection was most likely caused by an exomoon transit.

The Exomoon 2MASS J1119-1137 b exomoon system
Companion (in order from planet)	Mass	Semimajor axis (AU)	Orbital period	Eccentricity	Inclination	Radius
2MASS J1119-1137 b I (unconfirmed)	0.5–1 Earth Masses	0.004–0.009 AU	—	—	—	1.7 Earth Radii

== See also ==
- PSO J318.5-22
- MOA-2011-BLG-262L
- Kepler-1625b I
- Kepler-1708b
- KOI-868.01
