= WASP-76b =

Hot Jupiter orbiting WASP-76

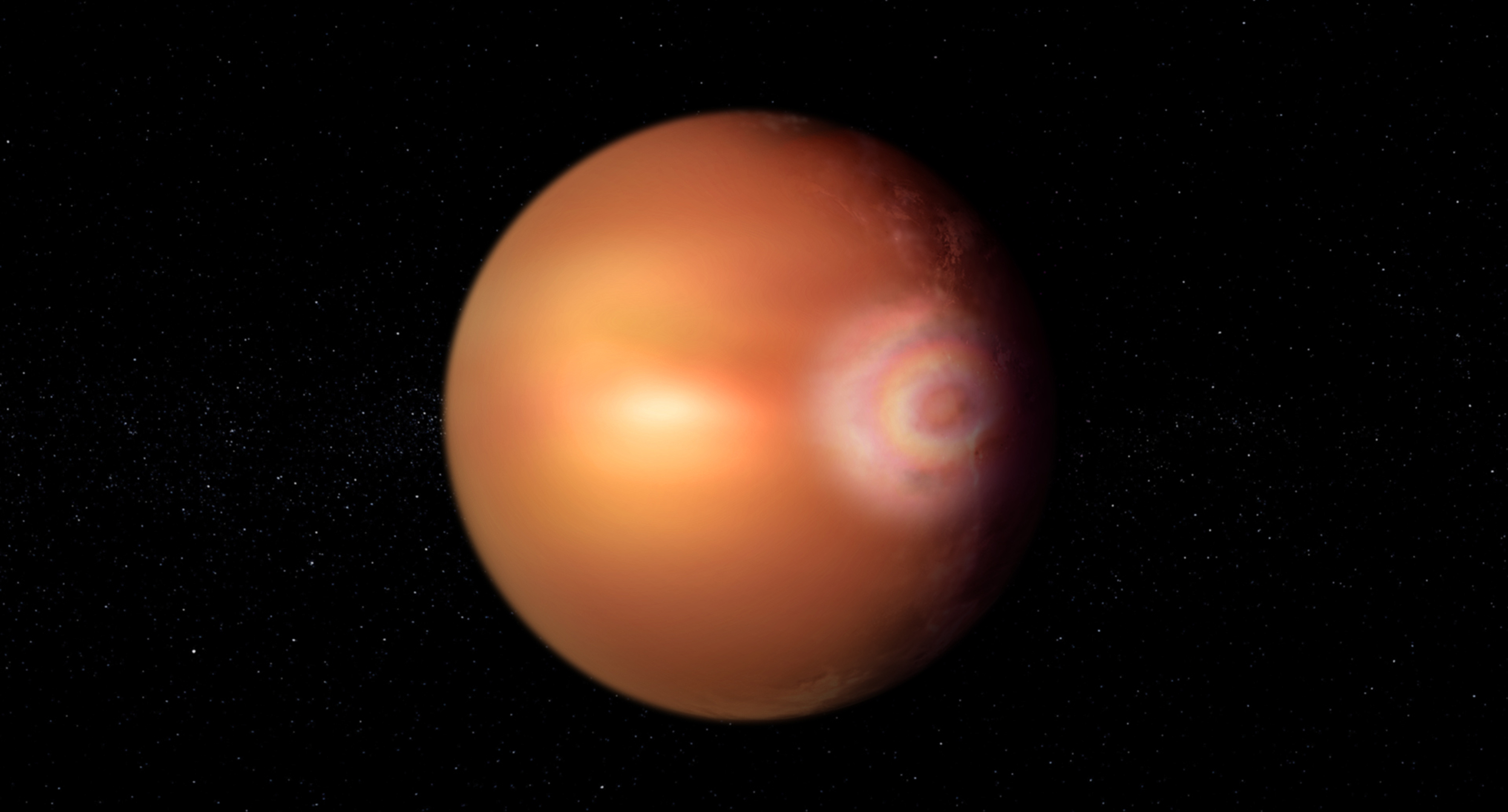
- Artistic image of WASP-76b, showing its possible glory effect

Discovery
- Discovered by: R.G. West et al. (SuperWASP)
- Discovery date: October 21, 2013
- Detection method: Transit (including secondary eclipses)

Orbital characteristics
- Semi-major axis: 0.03277±0.00078 AU
- Eccentricity: 0.00087±0.00031
- Orbital period (sidereal): 1.80988132(12) days
- Inclination: 87.88°±0.16°
- Star: WASP-76

Physical characteristics
- Mean radius: 1.842±0.024 R_{J}
- Mass: 0.921±0.032 M_{J}
- Temperature: 2,189±36 K

WASP-76b is an exoplanet classified as a Hot Jupiter. It is located in the constellation Pisces and orbits its host star, WASP-76, at a distance of approximately 0.033 AU (4.9 million km; 3.1 million mi). Its orbital period is approximately 1.8 days, and its mass is about 0.92 times that of Jupiter. The discovery of WASP-76b took place on October 21, 2016; as of 2022, it is the only known planet in the WASP-76 system. The equilibrium temperature of WASP-76b is estimated to be around 2,190 K (1,920 °C; 3,480 °F), However, the measured daytime temperature is higher, reaching approximately 2,500 ± 200 K (2,227 ± 200 °C; 4,040 ± 360 °F).

== Atmospheric composition ==
Data collected from the Hubble and Spitzer Space Telescopes have provided evidence of titanium oxide and small amounts of water within the planet's atmosphere. Further analysis using higher-resolution spectra has revealed the presence of ionized elements such as lithium, sodium, magnesium, calcium, manganese, potassium, and iron. The existence of calcium was confirmed by the Gemini North Observatory in 2021; in 2022, barium was also detected.

The atmosphere of WASP-76b is characterized as cloudy, predominantly grey, and exhibits significant thermal incandescence.

In April 2024, it was suggested that a glory effect in the atmosphere of WASP-76b might be responsible for the observed increase in brightness of its eastern terminator zone. If this interpretation could be confirmed, it would become the first extrasolar glory-like phenomenon to be discovered.

=== Iron rain ===
In March 2020, an initial spectroscopic analysis revealed the presence of neutral iron in the atmosphere of WASP-76b. The conditions required for the vaporization and condensation of neutral iron were determined to be a temperature of 2,400 °C (2,700 K; 4,400 °F) and a lower temperature of 1,400 °C (1,700 K; 2,600 °F) for condensation. Under these specific temperature conditions, neutral iron could potentially precipitate like liquid rain.

In May 2020, the Hubble Space Telescope discovered that the previous spectrum of WASP-76b had been distorted by the light from a companion star. Subsequently, an updated atmospheric model was developed using the most recent spectrum data. The revised model indicates the presence of a cloudy hydrogen-helium envelope and suggests the absence of previously reported neutral iron, including "iron rain." Additionally, only upper limits on the presence of titanium and vanadium oxides were detected. By 2021, the controversy surrounding the presence of iron condensation had been resolved by demonstrating that the observed signal may also be due to temperature variations between different parts of the planet. However, existing data is insufficient to definitively distinguish between these two scenarios.

Based on planetary atmospheric circulation models for WASP-76b, it is suggested that dense cloud layers composed of aluminum oxide, neutral iron, or magnesium orthosilicate may form. However, significant condensation of iron on the night side of the planet is not indicated by the available data.

== Possible exomoon ==
It has been speculated that a possible hot evaporating exomoon orbiting around WASP-76b could be consistent with an extrasolar toroidal atmosphere.

== Magnetosphere ==
In 2026, astronomers detected strong evidence for the magnetic field for seven ultra-hot Jupiters, including WASP-76b, which based on the measurement of their global wind speeds between dayside and nightside. Their magnetosphere $B$ values are comparable to that of Jupiter and Saturn.

== See also ==
- WASP-7b
- WASP-12b
- WASP-121b
