= List of exoplanets discovered by the Kepler space telescope: 501–1000 =

This is a partial list of exoplanets discovered by the Kepler space telescope, running from star number 501 through 1000, inclusive.

Table keys
| Planet type |
|---|
| Circumbinary planet |
| Planet orbits a single star in a multiple star system |
| Planet has a circumbinary orbit in a system with more than 2 stars |
| Planet discovered by Kepler community |
| Potentially habitable |
| None of the above |

== Table ==
| Planet | Discovery method | Mass (M_{J}) | Radius (R_{J}) | Density (g/cm^{3}) | Orbital period (days) | Semimajor axis (AU) | Orbital eccentricity | Year of confirmation | Ref. |
|---|---|---|---|---|---|---|---|---|---|
| Earth (for reference) | | 0.00315 | 0.0892 | 5.515 | 365.2563 | 1 | 0.0167 | — | |
| Kepler-501b | Transit | — | 0.384+0.062 −0.041 | — | 5.64067757 ±0.00000378 | — | — | 2016 | |
| Kepler-502b | Transit | — | 0.426+0.13 −0.059 | — | 4.28686431 ±0.00000322 | — | — | 2016 | |
| Kepler-503b | Transit | — | 0.559+0.128 −0.051 | — | 7.25844721 ±0.00000282 | — | — | 2016 | |
| Kepler-504b | Transit | — | 0.142+0.016 −0.02 | — | 9.54927542 ±0.00000499 | — | — | 2016 | |
| Kepler-505b | Transit | — | 0.232+0.01 −0.008 | — | 27.52197994 ±0.00003295 | — | — | 2016 | |
| Kepler-506b | Transit | — | 0.244±0.005 | — | 6.8834055 ±0.00000315 | — | — | 2016 | |
| Kepler-507b | Transit | — | 0.116+0.021 −0.015 | — | 3.56809693 ±0.00000707 | | — | 2016 | |
| Kepler-508b | Transit | — | 0.146+0.023 −0.017 | — | 25.30889748 ±0.00005747 | — | — | 2016 | |
| Kepler-509b | Transit | — | 0.222±0.005 | — | 41.74600392 ±0.00004444 | — | — | 2016 | |
| Kepler-510b | Transit | — | 0.22+0.021 −0.011 | — | 19.55659418 ±0.00003606 | | — | 2016 | |
| Kepler-511b | Transit | — | 0.567+0.125 −0.091 | — | 296.637865 ±0.0004472 | — | — | 2016 | |
| Kepler-512b | Transit | — | 0.24+0.044 −0.028 | — | 34.43587975 ±0.00008258 | — | — | 2016 | |
| Kepler-513b | Transit | — | 0.196+0.028 −0.018 | — | 28.86235584 ±0.00006735 | — | — | 2016 | |
| Kepler-514b | Transit | — | 0.153+0.025 −0.017 | — | 5.65179605 ±0.00001087 | — | — | 2016 | |
| Kepler-515b | Transit | — | 0.13+0.005 −0.004 | — | 19.96371318 ±0.00005659 | — | — | 2016 | |
| Kepler-516b | Transit | — | 0.512+0.128 −0.103 | — | 24.85462415 ±0.00002819 | — | — | 2016 | |
| Kepler-517b | Transit | — | 0.238+0.029 −0.02 | — | 60.92832271 ±0.00007053 | — | — | 2016 | |
| Kepler-518b | Transit | — | 0.188±0.004 | — | 8.51203588 ±0.0000045 | — | — | 2016 | |
| Kepler-519b | Transit | — | 0.187+0.005 −0.004 | — | 24.3078946 ±0.00002446 | — | — | 2016 | |
| Kepler-520b | Transit | — | 0.148+0.025 −0.009 | — | 19.67416124 ±0.00005245 | — | — | 2016 | |
| Kepler-520c | Transit | — | 0.095+0.006 −0.004 | — | 5.21104261 ±0.00001231 | — | — | 2016 | |
| Kepler-521b | Transit | — | 0.284+0.028 −0.021 | — | 22.20813214 ±0.00004013 | — | — | 2016 | |
| Kepler-522b | Transit | — | 0.616+0.134 −0.108 | — | 38.58422849 ±0.00004568 | — | — | 2016 | |
| Kepler-523b | Transit | — | 0.175+0.007 −0.005 | — | 5.83598311 ±0.00000466 | — | — | 2016 | |
| Kepler-524b | Transit | — | 0.17+0.012 −0.011 | — | 7.97419807 ±0.00002038 | — | — | 2016 | |
| Kepler-524c | Transit | — | 0.086+0.007 −0.006 | — | 1.88897906 ±0.0000107 | — | — | 2016 | |
| Kepler-525b | Transit | — | 0.235+0.034 −0.046 | — | 18.68404933 ±0.00005589 | — | — | 2016 | |
| Kepler-526b | Transit | — | 0.178+0.014 −0.015 | — | 5.45849832 ±0.00000907 | — | — | 2016 | |
| Kepler-527b | Transit | — | 0.253+0.12 −0.041 | — | 13.28535633 ±0.00002409 | — | — | 2016 | |
| Kepler-528b | Transit | — | 0.186+0.026 −0.017 | — | 19.78297415 ±0.00006532 | — | — | 2016 | |
| Kepler-529b | Transit | — | 0.166+0.022 −0.015 | — | 1.98035766 ±0.00000231 | — | — | 2016 | |
| Kepler-529c | Transit | — | 0.178+0.037 −0.019 | — | 12.8345022 ±0.00003659 | — | — | 2016 | |
| Kepler-530b | Transit | — | 0.269+0.015 −0.009 | — | 39.30941904 ±0.00004834 | — | — | 2016 | |
| Kepler-531b | Transit | — | 0.248+0.007 −0.017 | — | 29.88485741 ±0.00003246 | — | — | 2016 | |
| Kepler-532b | Transit | — | 0.229+0.019 −0.012 | — | 12.92491623 ±0.0000123 | — | — | 2016 | |
| Kepler-533b | Transit | — | 0.302+0.007 −0.029 | — | 28.51120525 ±0.00002321 | — | — | 2016 | |
| Kepler-534b | Transit | — | 0.2+0.007 −0.006 | — | 15.95994513 ±0.00002216 | — | — | 2016 | |
| Kepler-535b | Transit | — | 0.211+0.029 −0.019 | — | 4.90332155 ±0.00000454 | — | — | 2016 | |
| Kepler-536b | Transit | — | 0.277+0.034 −0.02 | — | 1.8270823 ±0.00000044 | — | — | 2016 | |
| Kepler-537b | Transit | — | 0.126+0.005 −0.004 | — | 3.24755522 ±0.00000526 | — | — | 2016 | |
| Kepler-538b | Transit | — | 0.202+0.009 −0.008 | — | 81.73780699 ±0.00009326 | — | — | 2016 | |
| Kepler-539b | Transit | 0.97±0.29 | 0.747±0.017 | 2.9±0.88 | 125.63243 ±0.00071 | 0.4988±0.0067 | 0.39 | 2016 | |
| Kepler-539c | Transit | 2.4±1.2 | — | — | 1000 | 2.42+0.5 −0.51 | 0.5±0.1 | 2016 | |
| Kepler-540b | Transit | — | 0.242+0.034 −0.023 | — | 172.7049784 ±0.0005356 | — | — | 2016 | |
| Kepler-541b | Transit | — | 0.3+0.052 −0.05 | — | 5.08005848 ±0.00001338 | — | — | 2016 | |
| Kepler-542b | Transit | — | 0.14+0.009 −0.01 | — | 13.14497566 ±0.00003491 | — | — | 2016 | |
| Kepler-543b | Transit | — | 0.223+0.011 −0.023 | — | 13.89961966 ±0.00001102 | — | — | 2016 | |
| Kepler-544b | Transit | — | 0.189+0.017 −0.012 | — | 21.41616926 ±0.00008095 | — | — | 2016 | |
| Kepler-545b | Transit | — | 0.24+0.027 −0.019 | — | 13.24934059 ±0.00002104 | — | — | 2016 | |
| Kepler-546b | Transit | — | 0.624+0.172 −0.069 | — | 4.14702026 ±0.00000088 | — | — | 2016 | |
| Kepler-547b | Transit | — | 0.357+0.012 −0.028 | — | 6.01038429 ±0.00000157 | — | — | 2016 | |
| Kepler-548b | Transit | — | 1.07+0.195 −0.098 | — | 4.45419434 ±0.00000038 | — | — | 2016 | |
| Kepler-549b | Transit | — | 0.229+0.021 −0.015 | — | 42.9495649 ±0.0001543 | — | — | 2016 | |
| Kepler-549c | Transit | — | 0.261+0.022 −0.053 | — | 117.040498 ±0.001777 | — | — | 2016 | |
| Kepler-550b | Transit | — | 0.394+0.03 −0.024 | — | 8.60010411 ±0.00000425 | — | — | 2016 | |
| Kepler-551b | Transit | — | 0.244+0.022 −0.013 | — | 12.3764661 ±0.00001298 | — | — | 2016 | |
| Kepler-552b | Transit | — | 0.352+0.073 −0.051 | — | 5.26341577 ±0.0000029 | — | — | 2016 | |
| Kepler-553b | Transit | — | 0.413+0.012 −0.016 | — | 4.03046804 ±0.00000164 | — | — | 2016 | |
| Kepler-553c | Transit | — | 0.999+0.029 −0.028 | — | 328.2399546 ±0.0003646 | — | — | 2016 | |
| Kepler-554b | Transit | — | 0.383+0.024 −0.019 | — | 1.90220856 ±0.00000041 | — | — | 2016 | |
| Kepler-555b | Transit | — | 0.252+0.05 −0.026 | — | 16.21775407 ±0.0000289 | — | — | 2016 | |
| Kepler-556b | Transit | — | 0.2+0.018 −0.011 | — | 11.72292176 ±0.00002381 | — | — | 2016 | |
| Kepler-557b | Transit | — | 0.238+0.071 −0.034 | — | 3.70598955 ±0.00000487 | — | — | 2016 | |
| Kepler-558b | Transit | — | 0.211+0.015 −0.012 | — | 29.00790538 ±0.00008906 | — | — | 2016 | |
| Kepler-559b | Transit | — | 0.322+0.057 −0.032 | — | 17.58752333 ±0.00002056 | — | — | 2016 | |
| Kepler-560b | Transit | — | 0.153±0.008 | — | 18.47764449 ±0.00001517 | — | — | 2016 | |
| Kepler-561b | Transit | — | 0.621+0.108 −0.054 | — | 58.3620495 ±0.00003229 | — | — | 2016 | |
| Kepler-561c | Transit | — | 0.239+0.038 −0.022 | — | 5.35016198 ±0.00000443 | — | — | 2016 | |
| Kepler-562b | Transit | — | 0.465+0.057 −0.036 | — | 18.00931444 ±0.0000099 | — | — | 2016 | |
| Kepler-563b | Transit | — | 0.276+0.015 −0.018 | — | 22.18432708 ±0.000025 | — | — | 2016 | |
| Kepler-564b | Transit | — | 0.413+0.059 −0.032 | — | 3.75083228 ±0.00000122 | — | — | 2016 | |
| Kepler-565b | Transit | — | 0.325+0.045 −0.024 | — | 4.24374723 ±0.00000293 | — | — | 2016 | |
| Kepler-566b | Transit | — | 0.192±0.012 | — | 18.42794624 ±0.0000423 | — | — | 2016 | |
| Kepler-567b | Transit | — | 0.201+0.013 −0.011 | — | 16.54297375 ±0.00004149 | — | — | 2016 | |
| Kepler-568b | Transit | — | 0.202±0.007 | — | 11.02347475 ±0.00000766 | — | — | 2016 | |
| Kepler-569b | Transit | — | 0.282+0.02 −0.015 | — | 34.18890521 ±0.00006016 | — | — | 2016 | |
| Kepler-570b | Transit | — | 0.219+0.03 −0.013 | — | 4.301662 ±0.0000031 | — | — | 2016 | |
| Kepler-571b | Transit | — | 0.236+0.029 −0.015 | — | 4.79859939 ±0.0000054 | — | — | 2016 | |
| Kepler-572b | Transit | — | 0.23+0.016 −0.015 | — | 17.20523483 ±0.00002222 | — | — | 2016 | |
| Kepler-573b | Transit | — | 0.249+0.032 −0.021 | — | 22.18329658 ±0.00004593 | — | — | 2016 | |
| Kepler-574b | Transit | — | 0.213+0.029 −0.014 | — | 7.65880414 ±0.00001346 | — | — | 2016 | |
| Kepler-575b | Transit | — | 0.213+0.046 −0.019 | — | 9.37891944 ±0.00002371 | — | — | 2016 | |
| Kepler-576b | Transit | — | 0.292+0.075 −0.035 | — | 29.91136794 ±0.00009909 | — | — | 2016 | |
| Kepler-577b | Transit | — | 0.227+0.034 −0.013 | — | 25.69578251 ±0.0000632 | — | — | 2016 | |
| Kepler-578b | Transit | — | 0.178+0.016 −0.02 | — | 1.6168837 ±0.00000123 | — | — | 2016 | |
| Kepler-579b | Transit | — | 0.178+0.031 −0.016 | — | 9.66857723 ±0.0000192 | — | — | 2016 | |
| Kepler-580b | Transit | — | 0.229+0.026 −0.012 | — | 8.22241966 ±0.00000979 | — | — | 2016 | |
| Kepler-581b | Transit | — | 0.235+0.05 −0.026 | — | 40.6069821 ±0.0001744 | — | — | 2016 | |
| Kepler-582b | Transit | — | 0.328+0.049 −0.03 | — | 18.49235668 ±0.00002487 | — | — | 2016 | |
| Kepler-583b | Transit | — | 0.203+0.026 −0.013 | — | 6.5100253 ±0.00001381 | — | — | 2016 | |
| Kepler-584b | Transit | — | 0.376+0.142 −0.05 | — | 35.1810304 ±0.00009392 | — | — | 2016 | |
| Kepler-585b | Transit | — | 0.252+0.049 −0.024 | — | 2.75235975 ±0.00000142 | — | — | 2016 | |
| Kepler-586b | Transit | — | 0.249+0.032 −0.018 | — | 2.10472218 ±0.00000092 | — | — | 2016 | |
| Kepler-587b | Transit | — | 0.199+0.057 −0.015 | — | 10.94027841 ±0.00002949 | — | — | 2016 | |
| Kepler-588b | Transit | — | 0.235+0.045 −0.02 | — | 4.22162536 ±0.00000475 | — | — | 2016 | |
| Kepler-589b | Transit | — | 0.203+0.016 −0.011 | — | 16.54964934 ±0.00004571 | — | — | 2016 | |
| Kepler-590b | Transit | — | 0.359+0.097 −0.045 | — | 5.85296257 ±0.00000474 | — | — | 2016 | |
| Kepler-591b | Transit | — | 0.302+0.049 −0.022 | — | 81.1694299 ±0.0003199 | — | — | 2016 | |
| Kepler-592b | Transit | — | 0.213+0.052 −0.022 | — | 2.82019241 ±0.00000379 | — | — | 2016 | |
| Kepler-593b | Transit | — | 0.256+0.062 −0.026 | — | 21.21708973 ±0.00005927 | — | — | 2016 | |
| Kepler-594b | Transit | — | 0.194+0.02 −0.013 | — | 13.64618192 ±0.00003489 | — | — | 2016 | |
| Kepler-595b | Transit | — | 0.34+0.025 −0.015 | — | 25.30292332 ±0.00003003 | — | — | 2016 | |
| Kepler-596b | Transit | — | 0.309+0.145 −0.042 | — | 21.30022655 ±0.00004193 | — | — | 2016 | |
| Kepler-597b | Transit | — | 0.211+0.029 −0.012 | — | 13.02365861 ±0.00002728 | — | — | 2016 | |
| Kepler-598b | Transit | — | 0.134+0.011 −0.008 | — | 3.70175428 ±0.00000971 | — | — | 2016 | |
| Kepler-599b | Transit | — | 0.253+0.013 −0.029 | — | 15.65562652 ±0.00003161 | — | — | 2016 | |
| Kepler-600b | Transit | — | 0.259+0.019 −0.035 | — | 23.67517607 ±0.00005668 | — | — | 2016 | |
| Kepler-601b | Transit | — | 0.17+0.024 −0.016 | — | 5.37886844 ±0.00000727 | — | — | 2016 | |
| Kepler-602b | Transit | — | 0.186+0.058 −0.029 | — | 15.28469497 ±0.00006919 | — | — | 2016 | |
| Kepler-603b | Transit | — | 0.236+0.053 −0.023 | — | 21.05358596 ±0.00008943 | — | — | 2016 | |
| Kepler-603c | Transit | — | 0.58+0.132 −0.055 | — | 127.9075774 ±0.0004999 | — | — | 2016 | |
| Kepler-603d | Transit | — | 0.118+0.022 −0.012 | — | 6.2171292 ±0.00004234 | — | — | 2016 | |
| Kepler-604b | Transit | — | 0.231+0.044 −0.024 | — | 25.85501786 ±0.00009434 | — | — | 2016 | |
| Kepler-605b | Transit | — | 0.128+0.015 −0.008 | — | 3.38353807 ±0.00000511 | — | — | 2016 | |
| Kepler-605c | Transit | — | 0.077+0.01 −0.005 | — | 2.35895152 ±0.00000837 | — | — | 2016 | |
| Kepler-606b | Transit | — | 0.295+0.113 −0.045 | — | 24.31575992 ±0.00007998 | — | — | 2016 | |
| Kepler-607b | Transit | — | 0.078+0.005 −0.006 | — | 0.6381632 ±0.00000168 | — | — | 2016 | |
| Kepler-608b | Transit | — | 0.325+0.064 −0.039 | — | 6.41251504 ±0.00000542 | — | — | 2016 | |
| Kepler-609b | Transit | — | 0.299+0.095 −0.039 | — | 6.52121067 ±0.00000864 | — | — | 2016 | |
| Kepler-610b | Transit | — | 0.374+0.103 −0.04 | — | 6.99692655 ±0.00000559 | — | — | 2016 | |
| Kepler-610c | Transit | — | 0.294+0.075 −0.033 | — | 151.86392 ±0.001118 | — | — | 2016 | |
| Kepler-611b | Transit | — | 0.147+0.045 −0.013 | — | 2.4370333 ±0.00000503 | — | — | 2016 | |
| Kepler-612b | Transit | — | 0.253+0.059 −0.024 | — | 3.72215641 ±0.00000376 | — | — | 2016 | |
| Kepler-613b | Transit | — | 0.204+0.036 −0.015 | — | 15.77979614 ±0.00004258 | — | — | 2016 | |
| Kepler-614b | Transit | — | 0.213+0.018 −0.015 | — | 14.03491514 ±0.00002597 | — | — | 2016 | |
| Kepler-615b | Transit | — | 0.155+0.008 −0.009 | — | 10.35584657 ±0.00001854 | — | — | 2016 | |
| Kepler-616b | Transit | — | 0.217+0.029 −0.018 | — | 9.99761851 ±0.00002138 | — | — | 2016 | |
| Kepler-616c | Transit | — | 0.304+0.051 −0.027 | — | 90.4113556 ±0.0004522 | — | — | 2016 | |
| Kepler-617b | Transit | — | 0.118±0.006 | — | 1.68269615 ±0.00000111 | — | — | 2016 | |
| Kepler-618b | Transit | — | 0.232+0.07 −0.037 | — | 3.59576964 ±0.00000882 | — | — | 2016 | |
| Kepler-619b | Transit | — | 0.282+0.058 −0.028 | — | 5.4042722 ±0.00000555 | — | — | 2016 | |
| Kepler-619c | Transit | — | 0.151+0.035 −0.015 | — | 1.20846503 ±0.00000167 | — | — | 2016 | |
| Kepler-620b | Transit | — | 0.296+0.109 −0.062 | — | 12.91375431 ±0.00004951 | — | — | 2016 | |
| Kepler-621b | Transit | — | 0.205+0.006 −0.017 | — | 2.62811375 ±0.00000177 | — | — | 2016 | |
| Kepler-622b | Transit | — | 0.19+0.025 −0.014 | — | 14.28226676 ±0.00002663 | — | — | 2016 | |
| Kepler-623b | Transit | — | 0.269+0.03 −0.019 | — | 9.07097734 ±0.00001283 | — | — | 2016 | |
| Kepler-624b | Transit | — | 0.206+0.029 −0.021 | — | 14.58649607 ±0.00002876 | — | — | 2016 | |
| Kepler-625b | Transit | — | 0.178+0.005 −0.004 | — | 7.75192492 ±0.00001063 | — | — | 2016 | |
| Kepler-625c | Transit | — | 0.094+0.004 −0.003 | — | 4.1653651 ±0.00001304 | — | — | 2016 | |
| Kepler-626b | Transit | — | 0.204+0.025 −0.018 | — | 14.48585199 ±0.00002363 | — | — | 2016 | |
| Kepler-627b | Transit | — | 0.333+0.143 −0.073 | — | 40.6994443 ±0.0001783 | — | — | 2016 | |
| Kepler-628b | Transit | — | 0.749+0.145 −0.126 | — | 15.4580567 ±0.00000295 | — | — | 2016 | |
| Kepler-629b | Transit | — | 0.123+0.005 −0.004 | — | 7.2385854 ±0.0000118 | — | — | 2016 | |
| Kepler-630b | Transit | — | 0.284±0.03 | — | 161.4743937 ±0.0009011 | — | — | 2016 | |
| Kepler-631b | Transit | — | 0.259+0.029 −0.021 | — | 17.97979059 ±0.0000377 | — | — | 2016 | |
| Kepler-632b | Transit | — | 0.197+0.029 −0.007 | — | 30.99660733 ±0.00004756 | — | — | 2016 | |
| Kepler-633b | Transit | — | 0.145+0.028 −0.019 | — | 8.50340718 ±0.0000268 | — | — | 2016 | |
| Kepler-634b | Transit | — | 0.169+0.027 −0.022 | — | 5.16950177 ±0.00001029 | — | — | 2016 | |
| Kepler-635b | Transit | — | 0.236+0.032 −0.024 | — | 23.44971004 ±0.00007672 | — | — | 2016 | |
| Kepler-636b | Transit | — | 0.397±0.012 | — | 16.08066115 ±0.0000056 | — | — | 2016 | |
| Kepler-637b | Transit | — | 0.424+0.045 −0.05 | — | 23.20584623 ±0.00005368 | — | — | 2016 | |
| Kepler-638b | Transit | — | 0.163+0.05 −0.028 | — | 6.07972888 ±0.00001513 | — | — | 2016 | |
| Kepler-639b | Transit | — | 0.212+0.049 −0.03 | — | 10.21420496 ±0.00002131 | — | — | 2016 | |
| Kepler-640b | Transit | — | 0.228+0.007 −0.02 | — | 22.24813967 ±0.00003515 | — | — | 2016 | |
| Kepler-641b | Transit | — | 0.165+0.028 −0.022 | — | 9.48961571 ±0.00002398 | — | — | 2016 | |
| Kepler-642b | Transit | — | 0.259+0.116 −0.05 | — | 4.41745855 ±0.0000066 | — | — | 2016 | |
| Kepler-643b | Transit | — | 0.906+0.031 −0.024 | — | 16.33889626 ±0.00001826 | — | — | 2016 | |
| Kepler-644b | Transit | — | 0.281+0.103 −0.054 | — | 3.1739171 ±0.00000423 | — | — | 2016 | |
| Kepler-645b | Transit | — | 0.187+0.056 −0.025 | — | 3.27582262 ±0.00000477 | — | — | 2016 | |
| Kepler-646b | Transit | — | 0.178+0.033 −0.017 | — | 15.87364565 ±0.000043 | — | — | 2016 | |
| Kepler-647b | Transit | — | 0.104+0.012 −0.01 | — | 16.2254649 ±0.0001556 | — | — | 2016 | |
| Kepler-648b | Transit | — | 0.287+0.011 −0.021 | — | 17.4211749 ±0.00002066 | — | — | 2016 | |
| Kepler-649b | Transit | — | 0.202+0.012 −0.011 | — | 29.90722674 ±0.00005373 | — | — | 2016 | |
| Kepler-650b | Transit | — | 0.264+0.045 −0.04 | — | 3.03214559 ±0.00000331 | — | — | 2016 | |
| Kepler-651b | Transit | — | 0.211+0.02 −0.012 | — | 21.38521506 ±0.0000388 | — | — | 2016 | |
| Kepler-652b | Transit | — | 0.222+0.005 −0.004 | — | 4.18200253 ±0.00000172 | — | — | 2016 | |
| Kepler-653b | Transit | — | 0.174+0.026 −0.023 | — | 14.70748976 ±0.00003759 | — | — | 2016 | |
| Kepler-653c | Transit | — | 0.07+0.012 −0.011 | — | 0.90037648 ±0.00000363 | — | — | 2016 | |
| Kepler-654b | Transit | — | 0.185+0.033 −0.023 | — | 13.72465129 ±0.00005006 | — | — | 2016 | |
| Kepler-655b | Transit | — | 0.242+0.037 −0.024 | — | 46.4063358 ±0.0001651 | — | — | 2016 | |
| Kepler-656b | Transit | — | 0.278+0.019 −0.03 | — | 1.26025909 ±0.00000066 | — | — | 2016 | |
| Kepler-657b | Transit | — | 0.314+0.062 −0.029 | — | 24.54350418 ±0.00006435 | — | — | 2016 | |
| Kepler-658b | Transit | — | 0.145±0.005 | — | 1.28707676 ±0.00000119 | — | — | 2016 | |
| Kepler-659b | Transit | — | 0.223+0.029 −0.021 | — | 17.671796 ±0.00005558 | — | — | 2016 | |
| Kepler-660b | Transit | — | 0.229+0.01 −0.015 | — | 9.27358194 ±0.00001178 | — | — | 2016 | |
| Kepler-661b | Transit | — | 0.274+0.011 −0.019 | — | 6.02930132 ±0.00000536 | — | — | 2016 | |
| Kepler-662b | Transit | — | 0.194+0.01 −0.011 | — | 21.67697486 ±0.00006711 | — | — | 2016 | |
| Kepler-663b | Transit | — | 0.232+0.018 −0.014 | — | 4.99678284 ±0.00001448 | — | — | 2016 | |
| Kepler-664b | Transit | — | 0.237+0.061 −0.022 | — | 2.52559332 ±0.00000367 | — | — | 2016 | |
| Kepler-665b | Transit | — | 0.232±0.013 | — | 16.01310205 ±0.00004308 | — | — | 2016 | |
| Kepler-666b | Transit | — | 0.214+0.052 −0.025 | — | 4.49876092 ±0.00001769 | — | — | 2016 | |
| Kepler-667b | Transit | — | 0.422+0.035 −0.025 | — | 41.43962808 ±0.00008183 | — | — | 2016 | |
| Kepler-668b | Transit | — | 0.241+0.021 −0.016 | — | 8.35390639 ±0.00001695 | — | — | 2016 | |
| Kepler-669b | Transit | — | 0.431+0.114 −0.049 | — | 4.12554687 ±0.0000031 | — | — | 2016 | |
| Kepler-670b | Transit | — | 1.176+0.262 −0.108 | — | 2.81650485 ±0.00000015 | — | — | 2016 | |
| Kepler-671b | Transit | — | 0.24+0.044 −0.018 | — | 4.28095859 ±0.00000648 | — | — | 2016 | |
| Kepler-672b | Transit | — | 0.223+0.029 −0.016 | — | 38.3774623 ±0.0001555 | — | — | 2016 | |
| Kepler-673b | Transit | — | 0.583+0.047 −0.043 | — | 3.72873109 ±0.00000093 | — | — | 2016 | |
| Kepler-674b | Transit | — | 0.151+0.009 −0.006 | — | 2.24338185 ±0.00000272 | — | — | 2016 | |
| Kepler-675b | Transit | — | 0.218+0.021 −0.014 | — | 2.33743801 ±0.00000207 | — | — | 2016 | |
| Kepler-676b | Transit | — | 0.271+0.012 −0.03 | — | 11.59822172 ±0.00001399 | — | — | 2016 | |
| Kepler-677b | Transit | — | 0.48+0.104 −0.037 | — | 6.57531678 ±0.00000369 | — | — | 2016 | |
| Kepler-678b | Transit | — | 0.459+0.059 −0.031 | — | 7.27503724 ±0.00000427 | — | — | 2016 | |
| Kepler-679b | Transit | — | 0.269+0.029 −0.035 | — | 12.39358604 ±0.00003829 | — | — | 2016 | |
| Kepler-680b | Transit | — | 0.216+0.073 −0.022 | — | 3.68992629 ±0.00000943 | — | — | 2016 | |
| Kepler-681b | Transit | — | 0.275±0.014 | — | 26.39435646 ±0.00006078 | — | — | 2016 | |
| Kepler-682b | Transit | — | 0.658+0.069 −0.045 | — | 12.61190667 ±0.00000646 | — | — | 2016 | |
| Kepler-683b | Transit | — | 0.176+0.03 −0.015 | — | 2.53918318 ±0.00000511 | — | — | 2016 | |
| Kepler-684b | Transit | — | 0.3±0.027 | — | 6.77030201 ±0.00000886 | — | — | 2016 | |
| Kepler-685b | Transit | — | 0.944+0.273 −0.106 | — | 1.6255222 ±0.00000015 | — | — | 2016 | |
| Kepler-686b | Transit | — | 1.084+0.176 −0.09 | — | 1.59474546 ±0.00000011 | — | — | 2016 | |
| Kepler-687b | Transit | — | 0.314+0.014 −0.018 | — | 20.50586978 ±0.00002828 | — | — | 2016 | |
| Kepler-688b | Transit | — | 0.871+0.157 −0.087 | — | 3.89593684 ±0.0000008 | — | — | 2016 | |
| Kepler-689b | Transit | — | 0.258+0.031 −0.021 | — | 22.36656079 ±0.00009811 | — | — | 2016 | |
| Kepler-690b | Transit | — | 0.531+0.163 −0.067 | — | 7.74809437 ±0.00000763 | — | — | 2016 | |
| Kepler-691b | Transit | — | 0.186±0.008 | — | 8.114379 ±0.00001125 | — | — | 2016 | |
| Kepler-692b | Transit | — | 0.277+0.033 −0.021 | — | 21.81293494 ±0.0000714 | — | — | 2016 | |
| Kepler-693b | Transit | — | 0.908+0.045 −0.069 | — | 15.37563332 ±0.00001072 | — | — | 2016 | |
| Kepler-694b | Transit | — | 0.25+0.046 −0.02 | — | 6.36584161 ±0.0000081 | — | — | 2016 | |
| Kepler-695b | Transit | — | 0.822+0.063 −0.05 | — | 3.04033042 ±0.0000003 | — | — | 2016 | |
| Kepler-696b | Transit | — | 0.548+0.145 −0.062 | — | 4.19042557 ±0.0000016 | — | — | 2016 | |
| Kepler-697b | Transit | — | 0.368+0.049 −0.028 | — | 3.70987065 ±0.00000305 | — | — | 2016 | |
| Kepler-698b | Transit | — | 0.328±0.04 | — | 16.32976218 ±0.00003512 | — | — | 2016 | |
| Kepler-699b | Transit | — | 1.259+0.124 −0.108 | — | 27.80756293 ±0.00000529 | — | — | 2016 | |
| Kepler-700b | Transit | — | 0.534+0.081 −0.045 | — | 80.8720639 ±0.0001727 | — | — | 2016 | |
| Kepler-701b | Transit | — | 0.253+0.02 −0.04 | — | 10.35533177 ±0.00002064 | — | — | 2016 | |
| Kepler-702b | Transit | — | 0.818+0.075 −0.052 | — | 10.52629406 ±0.0000019 | — | — | 2016 | |
| Kepler-703b | Transit | — | 0.732+0.331 −0.124 | — | 4.58352176 ±0.00000173 | — | — | 2016 | |
| Kepler-704b | Transit | — | 0.233+0.054 −0.038 | — | 3.76182115 ±0.00001161 | — | — | 2016 | |
| Kepler-705b | Transit | — | 0.188+0.009 −0.007 | — | 56.0560538 ±0.0002486 | — | — | 2016 | |
| Kepler-706b | Transit | — | 1.175+0.106 −0.079 | — | 41.40831347 ±0.00000696 | — | — | 2016 | |
| Kepler-707b | Transit | — | 0.119+0.008 −0.009 | — | 2.23749275 ±0.00000468 | — | — | 2016 | |
| Kepler-708b | Transit | — | 0.261+0.057 −0.025 | — | 3.16789194 ±0.00000384 | — | — | 2016 | |
| Kepler-709b | Transit | — | 0.261+0.016 −0.017 | — | 16.08524954 ±0.00002644 | — | — | 2016 | |
| Kepler-710b | Transit | — | 0.168+0.021 −0.013 | — | 4.34728553 ±0.00000834 | — | — | 2016 | |
| Kepler-711b | Transit | — | 0.304+0.03 −0.056 | — | 23.58914398 ±0.00006647 | — | — | 2016 | |
| Kepler-712b | Transit | — | 0.304+0.012 −0.01 | — | 21.02247699 ±0.00004431 | — | — | 2016 | |
| Kepler-712c | Transit | — | 0.433+0.023 −0.037 | — | 226.89047 ±0.001096 | — | — | 2016 | |
| Kepler-713b | Transit | — | 0.221+0.045 −0.026 | — | 7.411141 ±0.00001344 | — | — | 2016 | |
| Kepler-714b | Transit | — | 0.863+0.222 −0.09 | — | 8.09888799 ±0.00000219 | — | — | 2016 | |
| Kepler-715b | Transit | — | 0.335+0.074 −0.045 | — | 10.00652995 ±0.00001932 | — | — | 2016 | |
| Kepler-716b | Transit | — | 0.259+0.031 −0.015 | — | 10.37168453 ±0.00001449 | — | — | 2016 | |
| Kepler-717b | Transit | — | 0.216+0.022 −0.031 | — | 4.40840023 ±0.00001493 | — | — | 2016 | |
| Kepler-718b | Transit | — | 1.477+0.622 −0.278 | — | 2.0523499 ±0.00000015 | — | — | 2016 | |
| Kepler-719b | Transit | — | 0.76+0.163 −0.08 | — | 5.00731778 ±0.00000125 | — | — | 2016 | |
| Kepler-720b | Transit | — | 0.75+0.144 −0.071 | — | 4.70832654 ±0.00000073 | — | — | 2016 | |
| Kepler-721b | Transit | — | 0.236±0.012 | — | 5.39202539 ±0.00000677 | — | — | 2016 | |
| Kepler-722b | Transit | — | 0.235+0.063 −0.026 | — | 4.09357325 ±0.0000081 | — | — | 2016 | |
| Kepler-722c | Transit | — | 0.252+0.05 −0.029 | — | 105.144749 ±0.001675 | — | — | 2016 | |
| Kepler-723b | Transit | — | 1.088+0.141 −0.07 | — | 4.08227507 ±0.00000023 | — | — | 2016 | |
| Kepler-724b | Transit | — | 0.294+0.036 −0.021 | — | 3.31494634 ±0.00000172 | — | — | 2016 | |
| Kepler-725b | Transit | — | 0.948+0.076 −0.053 | — | 39.64317811 ±0.0000111 | — | — | 2016 | |
| Kepler-726b | Transit | — | 0.291+0.029 −0.031 | — | 21.80451088 ±0.00004512 | — | — | 2016 | |
| Kepler-727b | Transit | — | 0.226+0.031 −0.028 | — | 5.15448442 ±0.00000858 | — | — | 2016 | |
| Kepler-728b | Transit | — | 0.298+0.04 −0.023 | — | 5.74347727 ±0.00000717 | — | — | 2016 | |
| Kepler-729b | Transit | — | 0.319+0.037 −0.022 | — | 3.16635371 ±0.00000242 | — | — | 2016 | |
| Kepler-729c | Transit Timing Variations | 0.031+0.010 −0.007 | — | — | 207.541+0.348 −0.248 | 0.6744±0.0023 | 0.436±0.017 | 2025 | |
| Kepler-730b | Transit | — | 0.822+0.227 −0.072 | — | 6.49168426 ±0.00000165 | — | — | 2016 | |
| Kepler-731b | Transit | — | 1.238+0.284 −0.136 | — | 3.85560355 ±0.00000029 | — | — | 2016 | |
| Kepler-732b | Transit | — | 0.194+0.011 −0.014 | — | 9.46781405 ±0.00000618 | — | — | 2016 | |
| Kepler-732c | Transit | — | 0.113+0.006 −0.009 | — | 0.89304124 ±0.00000046 | — | — | 2016 | |
| Kepler-733b | Transit | — | 0.252+0.041 −0.017 | — | 20.83424726 ±0.00005682 | — | — | 2016 | |
| Kepler-734b | Transit | — | 0.318±0.012 | — | 6.10485286 ±0.00000289 | — | — | 2016 | |
| Kepler-735b | Transit | — | 0.263+0.014 −0.011 | — | 11.51516988 ±0.00001516 | — | — | 2016 | |
| Kepler-736b | Transit | — | 0.261+0.015 −0.047 | — | 3.60147201 ±0.00000543 | — | — | 2016 | |
| Kepler-737b | Transit | — | 0.175±0.01 | — | 28.59915399 ±0.00005673 | — | — | 2016 | |
| Kepler-738b | Transit | — | 0.223+0.018 −0.015 | — | 24.58721573 ±0.00008802 | — | — | 2016 | |
| Kepler-739b | Transit | — | 0.296+0.044 −0.026 | — | 12.53248465 ±0.00002295 | — | — | 2016 | |
| Kepler-740b | Transit | — | 0.408+0.047 −0.024 | — | 3.58410122 ±0.00000199 | — | — | 2016 | |
| Kepler-741b | Transit | — | 0.265+0.09 −0.031 | — | 7.03902374 ±0.00001488 | — | — | 2016 | |
| Kepler-742b | Transit | — | 0.289+0.01 −0.015 | — | 8.36086824 ±0.00000631 | — | — | 2016 | |
| Kepler-743b | Transit | — | 0.108+0.003 −0.004 | — | 3.17926292 ±0.00000252 | — | — | 2016 | |
| Kepler-744b | Transit | — | 0.145+0.011 −0.008 | — | 12.06222443 ±0.00002649 | — | — | 2016 | |
| Kepler-745b | Transit | — | 0.193+0.052 −0.02 | — | 9.93143556 ±0.00005945 | — | — | 2016 | |
| Kepler-746b | Transit | — | 0.099+0.012 −0.008 | — | 3.48159251 ±0.00001115 | — | — | 2016 | |
| Kepler-747b | Transit | — | 0.47+0.026 −0.025 | — | 35.61760587 ±0.00005345 | — | — | 2016 | |
| Kepler-748b | Transit | — | 0.225+0.058 −0.026 | — | 7.40742793 ±0.00003434 | — | — | 2016 | |
| Kepler-749b | Transit | — | 0.277+0.021 −0.023 | — | 17.31716585 ±0.00004602 | — | — | 2016 | |
| Kepler-750b | Transit | — | 0.274+0.095 −0.036 | — | 9.42887179 ±0.00002438 | — | — | 2016 | |
| Kepler-750c | Transit | — | 0.145+0.058 −0.02 | — | 4.08899022 ±0.00001934 | — | — | 2016 | |
| Kepler-751b | Transit | — | 0.219+0.021 −0.016 | — | 17.44490636 ±0.000042 | — | — | 2016 | |
| Kepler-752b | Transit | — | 0.251+0.023 −0.019 | — | 18.82747265 ±0.00008811 | — | — | 2016 | |
| Kepler-753b | Transit | — | 0.17+0.022 −0.008 | — | 5.74772501 ±0.00000838 | — | — | 2016 | |
| Kepler-754b | Transit | — | 0.179+0.043 −0.023 | — | 14.5596237 ±0.0002013 | — | — | 2016 | |
| Kepler-755b | Transit | — | 0.157+0.005 −0.028 | — | 1.26909037 ±0.000001 | — | — | 2016 | |
| Kepler-755c | Transit | — | 0.112±0.004 | — | 2.85313364 ±0.00000412 | — | — | 2016 | |
| Kepler-756b | Transit | — | 0.1+0.008 −0.009 | — | 1.22486632 ±0.00000384 | — | — | 2016 | |
| Kepler-757b | Transit | — | 0.121+0.041 −0.02 | — | 1.02267882 ±0.00000244 | — | — | 2016 | |
| Kepler-758b | Transit | — | 0.221+0.049 −0.036 | — | 12.1097104 ±0.00007142 | — | — | 2016 | |
| Kepler-758c | Transit | — | 0.151+0.033 −0.026 | — | 4.75793986 ±0.00003846 | — | — | 2016 | |
| Kepler-758d | Transit | — | 0.189+0.042 −0.029 | — | 20.4966197 ±0.0002282 | — | — | 2016 | |
| Kepler-758e | Transit | — | 0.136+0.029 −0.022 | — | 8.1934719 ±0.0001036 | — | — | 2016 | |
| Kepler-759b | Transit | — | 0.203+0.044 −0.021 | — | 41.805985 ±0.0002082 | — | — | 2016 | |
| Kepler-760b | Transit | — | 0.273+0.023 −0.021 | — | 8.70419416 ±0.00001277 | — | — | 2016 | |
| Kepler-760c | Transit | — | 0.132+0.011 −0.008 | — | 2.46697439 ±0.00000658 | — | — | 2016 | |
| Kepler-761b | Transit | — | 0.181+0.022 −0.015 | — | 10.12804789 ±0.00002905 | — | — | 2016 | |
| Kepler-762b | Transit | — | 1.131+0.236 −0.112 | — | 3.7705521 ±0.00000094 | — | — | 2016 | |
| Kepler-763b | Transit | — | 0.109+0.008 −0.007 | — | 1.19655156 ±0.00000356 | — | — | 2016 | |
| Kepler-764b | Transit | — | 0.146+0.018 −0.012 | — | 7.33683936 ±0.00003735 | — | — | 2016 | |
| Kepler-765b | Transit | — | 0.217+0.047 −0.02 | — | 27.6655226 ±0.0001297 | — | — | 2016 | |
| Kepler-766b | Transit | — | 0.302+0.083 −0.036 | — | 6.10027804 ±0.0000164 | — | — | 2016 | |
| Kepler-767b | Transit | — | 0.592+0.077 −0.049 | — | 161.5280101 ±0.0003086 | — | — | 2016 | |
| Kepler-768b | Transit | — | 0.16+0.018 −0.012 | — | 11.3910025 ±0.00007499 | — | — | 2016 | |
| Kepler-769b | Transit | — | 0.261+0.116 −0.041 | — | 7.42608998 ±0.00001952 | — | — | 2016 | |
| Kepler-769c | Transit | — | 0.16+0.068 −0.024 | — | 15.9870174 ±0.0001999 | — | — | 2016 | |
| Kepler-770b | Transit | — | 0.205+0.029 −0.015 | — | 18.92540274 ±0.00005291 | — | — | 2016 | |
| Kepler-770c | Transit | — | 0.107+0.017 −0.009 | — | 1.47532231 ±0.00000419 | — | — | 2016 | |
| Kepler-770d | Transit | — | 0.125+0.017 −0.01 | — | 4.15244722 ±0.00001685 | — | — | 2016 | |
| Kepler-771b | Transit | — | 0.162+0.028 −0.019 | — | 8.73485836 ±0.00004732 | — | — | 2016 | |
| Kepler-772b | Transit | — | 0.162+0.033 −0.021 | — | 12.99207337 ±0.00005428 | — | — | 2016 | |
| Kepler-773b | Transit | — | 0.128+0.008 −0.006 | — | 3.74910006 ±0.00000714 | — | — | 2016 | |
| Kepler-774b | Transit | — | 0.283+0.041 −0.048 | — | 11.0895723 ±0.00004373 | — | — | 2016 | |
| Kepler-775b | Transit | — | 0.106±0.004 | — | 0.97486893 ±0.0000008 | — | — | 2016 | |
| Kepler-776b | Transit | — | 0.114+0.01 −0.006 | — | 4.89718784 ±0.00001969 | — | — | 2016 | |
| Kepler-777b | Transit | — | 0.131±0.007 | — | 5.72812599 ±0.00002019 | — | — | 2016 | |
| Kepler-778b | Transit | — | 0.15+0.009 −0.012 | — | 3.75574426 ±0.00001083 | — | — | 2016 | |
| Kepler-779b | Transit | — | 0.082±0.006 | — | 7.09714223 ±0.00002921 | — | — | 2016 | |
| Kepler-780b | Transit | — | 0.079+0.008 −0.005 | — | 0.67737516 ±0.00000125 | — | — | 2016 | |
| Kepler-781b | Transit | — | 0.258+0.044 −0.021 | — | 13.2140732 ±0.00003577 | — | — | 2016 | |
| Kepler-782b | Transit | — | 0.286+0.042 −0.027 | — | 158.6853308 ±0.0004373 | — | — | 2016 | |
| Kepler-783b | Transit | — | 0.07+0.004 −0.007 | — | 4.29264638 ±0.00003429 | — | — | 2016 | |
| Kepler-784b | Transit | — | 0.141+0.03 −0.029 | — | 31.5922646 ±0.0006809 | — | — | 2016 | |
| Kepler-785b | Transit | — | 1.162+0.039 −0.047 | — | 1.97376093 ±0.0000001 | — | — | 2016 | |
| Kepler-786b | Transit | — | 0.217+0.011 −0.006 | — | 53.5293487 ±0.0002571 | — | — | 2016 | |
| Kepler-787b | Transit | — | 0.114+0.005 −0.006 | — | 0.9283105 ±0.0000022 | — | — | 2016 | |
| Kepler-788b | Transit | — | 0.227+0.08 −0.036 | — | 8.39846269 ±0.00005719 | — | — | 2016 | |
| Kepler-789b | Transit | — | 0.189+0.037 −0.021 | — | 8.63847725 ±0.00003071 | — | — | 2016 | |
| Kepler-790b | Transit | — | 0.194+0.015 −0.012 | — | 13.73469807 ±0.00004026 | — | — | 2016 | |
| Kepler-791b | Transit | — | 0.272+0.118 −0.062 | — | 14.5539759 ±0.0001002 | — | — | 2016 | |
| Kepler-792b | Transit | — | 0.175+0.044 −0.021 | — | 11.30119217 ±0.00006491 | — | — | 2016 | |
| Kepler-793b | Transit | — | 0.122+0.025 −0.014 | — | 4.24153639 ±0.00002259 | — | — | 2016 | |
| Kepler-794b | Transit | — | 0.188+0.046 −0.03 | — | 11.13125132 ±0.00003571 | — | — | 2016 | |
| Kepler-795b | Transit | — | 0.15+0.016 −0.012 | — | 29.6193421 ±0.0001144 | — | — | 2016 | |
| Kepler-796b | Transit | — | 0.116+0.032 −0.02 | — | 6.40087618 ±0.00002313 | — | — | 2016 | |
| Kepler-797b | Transit | — | 0.194+0.038 −0.02 | — | 27.07237711 ±0.00009275 | — | — | 2016 | |
| Kepler-798b | Transit | — | 0.213+0.093 −0.03 | — | 13.71933369 ±0.00005734 | — | — | 2016 | |
| Kepler-799b | Transit | — | 0.614+0.076 −0.051 | — | 133.4605235 ±0.000253 | — | — | 2016 | |
| Kepler-800b | Transit | — | 0.254+0.03 −0.023 | — | 14.13176026 ±0.00004273 | — | — | 2016 | |
| Kepler-801b | Transit | — | 0.178+0.007 −0.009 | — | 11.41928253 ±0.00002439 | — | — | 2016 | |
| Kepler-802b | Transit | — | 0.316+0.042 −0.036 | — | 40.0587473 ±0.0001092 | — | — | 2016 | |
| Kepler-803b | Transit | — | 0.338+0.049 −0.034 | — | 50.28638192 ±0.00008862 | — | — | 2016 | |
| Kepler-804b | Transit | — | 0.173+0.021 −0.014 | — | 14.37457351 ±0.00003236 | — | — | 2016 | |
| Kepler-804c | Transit | — | 0.102+0.018 −0.012 | — | 9.65185017 ±0.00005013 | — | — | 2016 | |
| Kepler-805b | Transit | — | 0.258+0.012 −0.022 | — | 30.8638931 ±0.0001259 | — | — | 2016 | |
| Kepler-806b | Transit | — | 0.102+0.029 −0.021 | — | 8.09219642 ±0.00003302 | — | — | 2016 | |
| Kepler-807b | Transit | — | 0.93+0.178 −0.095 | — | 117.9310878 ±0.00008603 | — | — | 2016 | |
| Kepler-808b | Transit | — | 0.13+0.005 −0.007 | — | 0.63133235 ±0.00000035 | — | — | 2016 | |
| Kepler-809b | Transit | — | 0.269+0.06 −0.022 | — | 55.63934 ±0.0001825 | — | — | 2016 | |
| Kepler-810b | Transit | — | 0.172+0.037 −0.017 | — | 4.59725385 ±0.00002999 | — | — | 2016 | |
| Kepler-811b | Transit | — | 0.241+0.061 −0.043 | — | 23.58447697 ±0.00007601 | — | — | 2016 | |
| Kepler-812b | Transit | — | 0.317+0.12 −0.061 | — | 10.11716531 ±0.00002533 | — | — | 2016 | |
| Kepler-813b | Transit | — | 0.191+0.037 −0.017 | — | 19.12947337 ±0.00007455 | — | — | 2016 | |
| Kepler-814b | Transit | — | 0.189+0.062 −0.027 | — | 6.1469851 ±0.000025 | — | — | 2016 | |
| Kepler-815b | Transit | — | 0.367+0.017 −0.029 | — | 8.57503552 ±0.0000591 | — | — | 2016 | |
| Kepler-816b | Transit | — | 0.914+0.061 −0.048 | — | 10.50682565 ±0.00000382 | — | — | 2016 | |
| Kepler-817b | Transit | — | 0.806+0.184 −0.101 | — | 3.99010623 ±0.00000136 | — | — | 2016 | |
| Kepler-818b | Transit | — | 0.456+0.07 −0.038 | — | 10.03538581 ±0.00000659 | — | — | 2016 | |
| Kepler-819b | Transit | — | 0.246+0.022 −0.015 | — | 33.1995648 ±0.0001174 | — | — | 2016 | |
| Kepler-820b | Transit | — | 0.543+0.239 −0.079 | — | 127.8338098 ±0.0003082 | — | — | 2016 | |
| Kepler-821b | Transit | — | 0.117+0.009 −0.007 | — | 1.92279873 ±0.00000482 | — | — | 2016 | |
| Kepler-822b | Transit | — | 0.158+0.037 −0.019 | — | 3.22296927 ±0.00000946 | — | — | 2016 | |
| Kepler-823b | Transit | — | 0.14+0.028 −0.012 | — | 4.16809082 ±0.00001748 | — | — | 2016 | |
| Kepler-824b | Transit | — | 0.167+0.063 −0.021 | — | 4.51436633 ±0.00001397 | — | — | 2016 | |
| Kepler-825b | Transit | — | 0.136+0.035 −0.02 | — | 3.77360059 ±0.00001242 | — | — | 2016 | |
| Kepler-825c | Transit | — | 0.164+0.036 −0.021 | — | 8.1818246 ±0.00002265 | — | — | 2016 | |
| Kepler-826b | Transit | — | 0.112+0.018 −0.012 | — | 4.48758907 ±0.00001653 | — | — | 2016 | |
| Kepler-827b | Transit | — | 0.502+0.062 −0.041 | — | 51.92927591 ±0.00009288 | — | — | 2016 | |
| Kepler-828b | Transit | — | 0.135+0.007 −0.01 | — | 0.56785714 ±0.00000044 | — | — | 2016 | |
| Kepler-829b | Transit | — | 0.188+0.039 −0.016 | — | 6.88337562 ±0.00001963 | — | — | 2016 | |
| Kepler-830b | Transit | — | 0.152+0.054 −0.022 | — | 11.29695137 ±0.00006299 | — | — | 2016 | |
| Kepler-831b | Transit | — | 0.113+0.009 −0.006 | — | 5.62153941 ±0.00001272 | — | — | 2016 | |
| Kepler-832b | Transit | — | 0.184+0.029 −0.015 | — | 7.1396941 ±0.00002817 | — | — | 2016 | |
| Kepler-833b | Transit | — | 0.18+0.011 −0.008 | — | 18.7546998 ±0.00005142 | — | — | 2016 | |
| Kepler-834b | Transit | — | 0.18±0.009 | — | 13.32388301 ±0.00005212 | — | — | 2016 | |
| Kepler-835b | Transit | — | 0.249+0.048 −0.026 | — | 11.41909375 ±0.00007116 | — | — | 2016 | |
| Kepler-836b | Transit | — | 0.244+0.057 −0.029 | — | 11.36112327 ±0.00002363 | — | — | 2016 | |
| Kepler-837b | Transit | — | 0.228+0.02 −0.038 | — | 16.56059504 ±0.00004293 | — | — | 2016 | |
| Kepler-838b | Transit | — | 0.244+0.045 −0.022 | — | 15.74957994 ±0.00004687 | — | — | 2016 | |
| Kepler-839b | Transit | — | 0.229+0.037 −0.022 | — | 37.8144514 ±0.0001545 | — | — | 2016 | |
| Kepler-840b | Transit | — | 1.523+0.346 −0.168 | — | 2.49577962 ±0.00000048 | — | — | 2016 | |
| Kepler-841b | Transit | — | 0.467+0.037 −0.032 | — | 124.4198398 ±0.000331 | — | — | 2016 | |
| Kepler-842b | Transit | — | 0.143+0.007 −0.008 | — | 1.21956827 ±0.0000011 | — | — | 2016 | |
| Kepler-843b | Transit | — | 0.231+0.054 −0.022 | — | 2.05387982 ±0.0000029 | — | — | 2016 | |
| Kepler-844b | Transit | — | 0.15+0.006 −0.021 | — | 2.61302086 ±0.00000624 | — | — | 2016 | |
| Kepler-845b | Transit | — | 0.182+0.008 −0.026 | — | 0.92785982 ±0.00000055 | — | — | 2016 | |
| Kepler-846b | Transit | — | 0.221+0.029 −0.016 | — | 19.80792185 ±0.00008966 | — | — | 2016 | |
| Kepler-847b | Transit | — | 0.105+0.008 −0.004 | — | 2.3432319 ±0.00000757 | — | — | 2016 | |
| Kepler-848b | Transit | — | 0.152+0.028 −0.022 | — | 6.91134416 ±0.00002461 | — | — | 2016 | |
| Kepler-849b | Transit | — | 0.637+0.133 −0.122 | — | 394.6244904 ±0.0008875 | — | — | 2016 | |
| Kepler-850b | Transit | — | 0.159+0.042 −0.019 | — | 7.19303878 ±0.00003818 | — | — | 2016 | |
| Kepler-851b | Transit | — | 0.15+0.024 −0.019 | — | 8.50699658 ±0.00003708 | — | — | 2016 | |
| Kepler-852b | Transit | — | 0.227+0.04 −0.015 | — | 44.9309804 ±0.00024 | — | — | 2016 | |
| Kepler-853b | Transit | — | 0.151+0.043 −0.025 | — | 7.16892463 ±0.00002302 | — | — | 2016 | |
| Kepler-854b | Transit | — | 1.492+0.604 −0.204 | — | 2.14463285 ±0.00000068 | — | — | 2016 | |
| Kepler-855b | Transit | — | 0.745+0.152 −0.072 | — | 7.8866311 ±0.00000247 | — | — | 2016 | |
| Kepler-856b | Transit | — | 0.83+0.112 −0.054 | — | 8.02768059 ±0.00000201 | — | — | 2016 | |
| Kepler-857b | Transit | — | 0.607+0.152 −0.061 | — | 85.35129427 ±0.00009562 | — | — | 2016 | |
| Kepler-858b | Transit | — | 0.434+0.021 −0.018 | — | 76.13602028 ±0.00005533 | — | — | 2016 | |
| Kepler-859b | Transit | — | 0.276+0.016 −0.013 | — | 20.38177573 ±0.00005321 | — | — | 2016 | |
| Kepler-860b | Transit | — | 0.289+0.072 −0.029 | — | 5.10137945 ±0.00000894 | — | — | 2016 | |
| Kepler-861b | Transit | — | 0.203+0.011 −0.012 | — | 3.94963138 ±0.00000549 | — | — | 2016 | |
| Kepler-862b | Transit | — | 0.197+0.039 −0.015 | — | 3.14866453 ±0.00000703 | — | — | 2016 | |
| Kepler-863b | Transit | — | 0.259+0.061 −0.029 | — | 15.59461874 ±0.00004285 | — | — | 2016 | |
| Kepler-864b | Transit | — | 0.214+0.056 −0.02 | — | 5.83376092 ±0.00001891 | — | — | 2016 | |
| Kepler-865b | Transit | — | 0.222+0.044 −0.021 | — | 14.16399294 ±0.00002463 | — | — | 2016 | |
| Kepler-866b | Transit | — | 0.145+0.007 −0.011 | — | 2.61703254 ±0.00000731 | — | — | 2016 | |
| Kepler-867b | Transit | — | 0.414+0.037 −0.027 | — | 150.242127 ±0.0006047 | — | — | 2016 | |
| Kepler-868b | Transit | — | 0.183+0.018 −0.015 | — | 5.03251791 ±0.00002082 | — | — | 2016 | |
| Kepler-869b | Transit | — | 0.322+0.074 −0.055 | — | 40.4287755 ±0.0001799 | — | — | 2016 | |
| Kepler-870b | Transit | — | 0.248+0.045 −0.026 | — | 21.3587621 ±0.0001184 | — | — | 2016 | |
| Kepler-871b | Transit | — | 0.334+0.096 −0.049 | — | 22.0459018 ±0.0001072 | — | — | 2016 | |
| Kepler-872b | Transit | — | 0.178+0.045 −0.021 | — | 2.57885507 ±0.00000517 | — | — | 2016 | |
| Kepler-873b | Transit | — | 0.335+0.146 −0.049 | — | 20.5533844 ±0.00007327 | — | — | 2016 | |
| Kepler-874b | Transit | — | 0.352+0.095 −0.053 | — | 40.0686727 ±0.0001013 | — | — | 2016 | |
| Kepler-875b | Transit | — | 0.259+0.091 −0.04 | — | 27.5073799 ±0.0001536 | — | — | 2016 | |
| Kepler-876b | Transit | — | 0.128+0.009 −0.008 | — | 5.14438011 ±0.00002466 | — | — | 2016 | |
| Kepler-877b | Transit | — | 0.189+0.012 −0.024 | — | 18.45847097 ±0.00004779 | — | — | 2016 | |
| Kepler-878b | Transit | — | 0.172+0.011 −0.009 | — | 25.9422033 ±0.0001029 | — | — | 2016 | |
| Kepler-879b | Transit | — | 0.229+0.059 −0.025 | — | 33.3855938 ±0.000142 | — | — | 2016 | |
| Kepler-879c | Transit | — | 0.04±0.01 | — | 0.646716±0.000003 | — | — | 2024 | |
| Kepler-880b | Transit | — | 0.237+0.094 −0.039 | — | 7.71468975 ±0.00001918 | — | — | 2016 | |
| Kepler-881b | Transit | — | 0.159+0.038 −0.029 | — | 4.44448017 ±0.0000253 | — | — | 2016 | |
| Kepler-882b | Transit | — | 0.11+0.013 −0.008 | — | 3.98953967 ±0.00000976 | — | — | 2016 | |
| Kepler-883b | Transit | — | 0.159+0.015 −0.012 | — | 12.98495573 ±0.00003436 | — | — | 2016 | |
| Kepler-884b | Transit | — | 0.11±0.004 | — | 5.69919514 ±0.00001359 | — | — | 2016 | |
| Kepler-885b | Transit | — | 0.223+0.036 −0.035 | — | 18.11472949 ±0.00005308 | — | — | 2016 | |
| Kepler-886b | Transit | — | 0.136+0.037 −0.017 | — | 6.24146367 ±0.00002154 | — | — | 2016 | |
| Kepler-887b | Transit | — | 0.164+0.024 −0.015 | — | 20.42228798 ±0.00009225 | — | — | 2016 | |
| Kepler-887c | Transit | — | 0.101+0.015 −0.01 | — | 7.63846023 ±0.00004957 | — | — | 2016 | |
| Kepler-888b | Transit | — | 0.157+0.007 −0.005 | — | 70.6979061 ±0.0003086 | — | — | 2016 | |
| Kepler-889b | Transit | — | 0.097+0.017 −0.012 | — | 3.744439 ±0.00001366 | — | — | 2016 | |
| Kepler-890b | Transit | — | 0.793+0.255 −0.095 | — | 52.75875577 ±0.00003345 | — | — | 2016 | |
| Kepler-891b | Transit | — | 0.572+0.13 −0.054 | — | 53.44945593 ±0.00006578 | — | — | 2016 | |
| Kepler-892b | Transit | — | 0.251+0.033 −0.024 | — | 13.7521072 ±0.00003106 | — | — | 2016 | |
| Kepler-893b | Transit | — | 0.27+0.046 −0.033 | — | 6.33855761 ±0.00001361 | — | — | 2016 | |
| Kepler-894b | Transit | — | 0.248+0.027 −0.03 | — | 9.803224 ±0.00003027 | — | — | 2016 | |
| Kepler-895b | Transit | — | 0.137+0.008 −0.006 | — | 2.80624233 ±0.00000817 | — | — | 2016 | |
| Kepler-896b | Transit | — | 0.226+0.016 −0.017 | — | 144.547396 ±0.002274 | — | — | 2016 | |
| Kepler-897b | Transit | — | 0.213+0.059 −0.022 | — | 8.0472642 ±0.00002943 | — | — | 2016 | |
| Kepler-898b | Transit | — | 0.133+0.027 −0.008 | — | 5.8706191 ±0.0000207 | — | — | 2016 | |
| Kepler-899b | Transit | — | 0.239+0.041 −0.023 | — | 19.17891293 ±0.00008075 | — | — | 2016 | |
| Kepler-900b | Transit | — | 0.186+0.011 −0.03 | — | 6.9913086 ±0.00001434 | — | — | 2016 | |
| Kepler-901b | Transit | — | 0.122+0.006 −0.005 | — | 3.51749439 ±0.00000352 | — | — | 2016 | |
| Kepler-902b | Transit | — | 0.227+0.029 −0.016 | — | 40.1099547 ±0.0001551 | — | — | 2016 | |
| Kepler-903b | Transit | — | 0.179+0.031 −0.032 | — | 10.3507721 ±0.00005128 | — | — | 2016 | |
| Kepler-903c | Transit | — | 0.226+0.036 −0.04 | — | 62.9228557 ±0.0007353 | — | — | 2016 | |
| Kepler-904b | Transit | — | 0.158+0.053 −0.021 | — | 3.02166863 ±0.00000893 | — | — | 2016 | |
| Kepler-905b | Transit | — | 0.126±0.004 | — | 5.08274652 ±0.00000837 | — | — | 2016 | |
| Kepler-906b | Transit | — | 0.188±0.009 | — | 41.6979976 ±0.0001595 | — | — | 2016 | |
| Kepler-907b | Transit | — | 0.107+0.005 −0.004 | — | 15.86621821 ±0.00006487 | — | — | 2016 | |
| Kepler-908b | Transit | — | 0.109+0.009 −0.007 | — | 1.34059747 ±0.00000195 | — | — | 2016 | |
| Kepler-909b | Transit | — | 0.131+0.014 −0.01 | — | 13.93290318 ±0.00004462 | — | — | 2016 | |
| Kepler-910b | Transit | — | 0.073+0.004 −0.003 | — | 2.36436901 ±0.00000883 | — | — | 2016 | |
| Kepler-911b | Transit | — | 0.232±0.009 | — | 20.310501 ±0.00005659 | — | — | 2016 | |
| Kepler-912b | Transit | — | 0.25+0.075 −0.045 | — | 2.53475627 ±0.00000798 | — | — | 2016 | |
| Kepler-913b | Transit | — | 0.184+0.007 −0.005 | — | 10.29672521 ±0.00003426 | — | — | 2016 | |
| Kepler-914b | Transit | — | 0.123+0.015 −0.011 | — | 4.40966548 ±0.00001193 | — | — | 2016 | |
| Kepler-915b | Transit | — | 0.134+0.029 −0.017 | — | 4.59489604 ±0.00001413 | — | — | 2016 | |
| Kepler-916b | Transit | — | 0.157±0.012 | — | 32.2968798 ±0.0002489 | — | — | 2016 | |
| Kepler-917b | Transit | — | 0.17+0.021 −0.015 | — | 2.97041437 ±0.00000913 | — | — | 2016 | |
| Kepler-918b | Transit | — | 0.155+0.036 −0.019 | — | 4.85386933 ±0.00003676 | — | — | 2016 | |
| Kepler-919b | Transit | — | 0.201+0.078 −0.026 | — | 11.04603384 ±0.000066 | — | — | 2016 | |
| Kepler-920b | Transit | — | 0.216+0.02 −0.014 | — | 6.53192704 ±0.00002296 | — | — | 2016 | |
| Kepler-920c | Transit | — | 0.339+0.052 −0.025 | — | 100.8274113 ±0.0007063 | — | — | 2016 | |
| Kepler-921b | Transit | — | 0.256+0.029 −0.065 | — | 51.300634 ±0.0006728 | — | — | 2016 | |
| Kepler-922b | Transit | — | 0.127+0.016 −0.01 | — | 0.93846683 ±0.00000095 | — | — | 2016 | |
| Kepler-923b | Transit | — | 0.123+0.026 −0.017 | — | 6.93366476 ±0.00003537 | — | — | 2016 | |
| Kepler-924b | Transit | — | 0.274+0.099 −0.054 | — | 61.0370117 ±0.0003366 | — | — | 2016 | |
| Kepler-925b | Transit | — | 0.209+0.059 −0.019 | — | 33.8678531 ±0.0001704 | — | — | 2016 | |
| Kepler-926b | Transit | — | 0.206+0.051 −0.021 | — | 52.0688601 ±0.0001903 | — | — | 2016 | |
| Kepler-927b | Transit | — | 0.153+0.036 −0.013 | — | 9.1149903 ±0.00003533 | — | — | 2016 | |
| Kepler-928b | Transit | — | 0.142+0.028 −0.011 | — | 3.9324613 ±0.00000965 | — | — | 2016 | |
| Kepler-929b | Transit | — | 0.099+0.024 −0.013 | — | 0.92103214 ±0.00000315 | — | — | 2016 | |
| Kepler-930b | Transit | — | 0.19+0.082 −0.037 | — | 71.4517775 ±0.0007523 | — | — | 2016 | |
| Kepler-931b | Transit | — | 0.119+0.012 −0.008 | — | 8.03755877 ±0.00002315 | — | — | 2016 | |
| Kepler-932b | Transit | — | 0.122+0.012 −0.009 | — | 1.9214374 ±0.00000212 | — | — | 2016 | |
| Kepler-933b | Transit | — | 0.219+0.021 −0.014 | — | 14.20443009 ±0.00006185 | — | — | 2016 | |
| Kepler-934b | Transit | — | 0.186+0.013 −0.01 | — | 55.6738309 ±0.0002829 | — | — | 2016 | |
| Kepler-935b | Transit | — | 0.12+0.007 −0.006 | — | 4.88083852 ±0.00001481 | — | — | 2016 | |
| Kepler-936b | Transit | — | 0.129+0.018 −0.009 | — | 10.56134221 ±0.00004545 | — | — | 2016 | |
| Kepler-937b | Transit | — | 0.332+0.115 −0.043 | — | 67.668827 ±0.0005833 | — | — | 2016 | |
| Kepler-937c | Transit | — | 0.238+0.081 −0.035 | — | 153.343364 ±0.003287 | — | — | 2016 | |
| Kepler-938b | Transit | — | 0.198+0.022 −0.014 | — | 52.6298417 ±0.0002898 | — | — | 2016 | |
| Kepler-939b | Transit | — | 0.156+0.028 −0.018 | — | 14.878296 ±0.0001256 | — | — | 2016 | |
| Kepler-940b | Transit | — | 0.298+0.063 −0.028 | — | 59.6225257 ±0.0003015 | — | — | 2016 | |
| Kepler-941b | Transit | — | 0.275+0.031 −0.054 | — | 17.42395198 ±0.000083 | — | — | 2016 | |
| Kepler-942b | Transit | — | 0.19+0.021 −0.007 | — | 44.96417488 ±0.00006962 | — | — | 2016 | |
| Kepler-943b | Transit | — | 0.529+0.07 −0.047 | — | 49.7701438 ±0.0001172 | — | — | 2016 | |
| Kepler-944b | Transit | — | 0.235+0.024 −0.019 | — | 43.3167737 ±0.0002351 | — | — | 2016 | |
| Kepler-945b | Transit | — | 0.235+0.042 −0.022 | — | 31.0033814 ±0.0002081 | — | — | 2016 | |
| Kepler-946b | Transit | — | 0.172+0.029 −0.018 | — | 11.79162572 ±0.00005506 | — | — | 2016 | |
| Kepler-947b | Transit | — | 0.203±0.021 | — | 26.9644317 ±0.000157 | — | — | 2016 | |
| Kepler-948b | Transit | — | 0.165+0.029 −0.037 | — | 7.76846622 ±0.00004201 | — | — | 2016 | |
| Kepler-949b | Transit | — | 0.26+0.032 −0.021 | — | 8.6893073 ±0.00000963 | — | — | 2016 | |
| Kepler-950b | Transit | — | 0.801+0.139 −0.074 | — | 98.7180406 ±0.0001748 | — | — | 2016 | |
| Kepler-951b | Transit | — | 0.499+0.021 −0.023 | — | 71.52530845 ±0.00008419 | — | — | 2016 | |
| Kepler-952b | Transit | — | 0.682+0.147 −0.067 | — | 130.3546919 ±0.0002069 | — | — | 2016 | |
| Kepler-953b | Transit | — | 0.376+0.033 −0.029 | — | 88.40655258 ±0.00008306 | — | — | 2016 | |
| Kepler-953c | Transit | — | 0.106+0.01 −0.008 | — | 9.10967112 ±0.00002528 | — | — | 2016 | |
| Kepler-954b | Transit | — | 0.207+0.004 −0.01 | — | 16.78176602 ±0.00001593 | — | — | 2016 | |
| Kepler-955b | Transit | — | 0.279+0.024 −0.015 | — | 14.53244172 ±0.00001662 | — | — | 2016 | |
| Kepler-956b | Transit | — | 0.268+0.07 −0.034 | — | 5.24867263 ±0.00000312 | — | — | 2016 | |
| Kepler-957b | Transit | — | 0.491+0.026 −0.029 | — | 5.90741354 ±0.00000507 | — | — | 2016 | |
| Kepler-958b | Transit | — | 0.184+0.009 −0.007 | — | 9.7678805 ±0.0000111 | — | — | 2016 | |
| Kepler-959b | Transit | — | 0.391+0.108 −0.078 | — | 14.80074836 ±0.00004706 | — | — | 2016 | |
| Kepler-960b | Transit | — | 0.204+0.006 −0.022 | — | 3.12686223 ±0.00000167 | — | — | 2016 | |
| Kepler-961b | Transit | — | 0.227+0.01 −0.007 | — | 16.87727414 ±0.00002872 | — | — | 2016 | |
| Kepler-962b | Transit | — | 0.176±0.007 | — | 12.05707239 ±0.00001586 | — | — | 2016 | |
| Kepler-963b | Transit | — | 0.237+0.027 −0.017 | — | 9.97683705 ±0.00001568 | — | — | 2016 | |
| Kepler-963c | Transit | — | 0.05±0.02 | — | 0.919783±0.000003 | — | — | 2024 | |
| Kepler-964b | Transit | — | 0.189+0.008 −0.006 | — | 13.5225106 ±0.00002258 | — | — | 2016 | |
| Kepler-965b | Transit | — | 0.302+0.049 −0.035 | — | 134.2527298 ±0.0005661 | — | — | 2016 | |
| Kepler-966b | Transit | — | 0.368+0.104 −0.052 | — | 99.747622 ±0.0004523 | — | — | 2016 | |
| Kepler-967b | Transit | — | 0.21+0.007 −0.009 | — | 13.22713379 ±0.00002209 | — | — | 2016 | |
| Kepler-967c | Transit | — | 0.326+0.013 −0.012 | — | 198.7112502 ±0.0006558 | — | — | 2016 | |
| Kepler-968b | Transit | — | 0.178±0.007 | — | 3.69298373 ±0.00000361 | — | — | 2016 | |
| Kepler-968c | Transit | — | 0.151+0.007 −0.006 | — | 5.70940492 ±0.00000954 | — | — | 2016 | |
| Kepler-969b | Transit | — | 0.185±0.004 | — | 34.1731714 ±0.00007358 | — | — | 2016 | |
| Kepler-969c | Transit | — | 0.088+0.002 −0.004 | — | 1.6829346 ±0.00000293 | — | — | 2016 | |
| Kepler-970b | Transit | — | 0.247+0.012 −0.038 | — | 16.73652231 ±0.00002699 | — | — | 2016 | |
| Kepler-971b | Transit | — | 0.19+0.02 −0.021 | — | 9.59070716 ±0.0000232 | — | — | 2016 | |
| Kepler-972b | Transit | — | 0.415+0.136 −0.098 | — | 7.03932553 ±0.00001608 | — | — | 2016 | |
| Kepler-973b | Transit | — | 0.175+0.007 −0.006 | — | 49.6077331 ±0.0001208 | — | — | 2016 | |
| Kepler-974b | Transit | — | 0.14+0.005 −0.026 | — | 4.19449651 ±0.00000503 | — | — | 2016 | |
| Kepler-975b | Transit | — | 0.132+0.005 −0.008 | — | 1.97034246 ±0.00000236 | — | — | 2016 | |
| Kepler-976b | Transit | — | 0.353+0.026 −0.018 | — | 105.9564148 ±0.0004626 | — | — | 2016 | |
| Kepler-977b | Transit | — | 0.234±0.015 | — | 26.85328322 ±0.00006393 | — | — | 2016 | |
| Kepler-978b | Transit | — | 0.267+0.06 −0.051 | — | 49.6221509 ±0.000171 | — | — | 2016 | |
| Kepler-979b | Transit | — | 0.243+0.037 −0.021 | — | 8.0880135 ±0.00001135 | — | — | 2016 | |
| Kepler-980b | Transit | — | 0.238+0.021 −0.04 | — | 11.55102504 ±0.00002754 | — | — | 2016 | |
| Kepler-981b | Transit | — | 0.206+0.027 −0.016 | — | 4.46975774 ±0.00000586 | — | — | 2016 | |
| Kepler-982b | Transit | — | 0.201+0.042 −0.024 | — | 15.7738221 ±0.00004115 | — | — | 2016 | |
| Kepler-983b | Transit | — | 0.211+0.006 −0.016 | — | 60.0855082 ±0.0002611 | — | — | 2016 | |
| Kepler-984b | Transit | — | 0.189+0.012 −0.01 | — | 43.0342272 ±0.0001479 | — | — | 2016 | |
| Kepler-985b | Transit | — | 0.266+0.012 −0.013 | — | 116.331901 ±0.001381 | — | — | 2016 | |
| Kepler-986b | Transit | — | 0.211+0.026 −0.017 | — | 56.4349938 ±0.0001446 | — | — | 2016 | |
| Kepler-987b | Transit | — | 0.291+0.014 −0.011 | — | 105.3033148 ±0.0004783 | — | — | 2016 | |
| Kepler-988b | Transit | — | 0.185+0.042 −0.014 | — | 17.76080053 ±0.00002728 | — | — | 2016 | |
| Kepler-989b | Transit | — | 0.197±0.012 | — | 7.96431535 ±0.00000962 | — | — | 2016 | |
| Kepler-990b | Transit | — | 0.232+0.058 −0.037 | — | 9.91723428 ±0.00002468 | — | — | 2016 | |
| Kepler-990c | Transit | — | 0.136+0.031 −0.017 | — | 0.53835431 ±0.00000067 | — | — | 2016 | |
| Kepler-991b | Transit | — | 0.227+0.012 −0.011 | — | 82.5342519 ±0.0003449 | — | — | 2016 | |
| Kepler-992b | Transit | — | 0.145+0.004 −0.024 | — | 20.16034462 ±0.00005016 | — | — | 2016 | |
| Kepler-993b | Transit | — | 0.265+0.016 −0.011 | — | 22.08557563 ±0.00004655 | — | — | 2016 | |
| Kepler-994b | Transit | — | 0.143+0.006 −0.024 | — | 1.15116651 ±0.00000057 | — | — | 2016 | |
| Kepler-995b | Transit | — | 0.241+0.017 −0.015 | — | 28.26731672 ±0.00008643 | — | — | 2016 | |
| Kepler-996b | Transit | — | 0.177+0.056 −0.022 | — | 3.77059058 ±0.00000806 | — | — | 2016 | |
| Kepler-997b | Transit | — | 0.121+0.029 −0.023 | — | 2.70730672 ±0.00000552 | — | — | 2016 | |
| Kepler-998b | Transit | — | 0.207+0.054 −0.027 | — | 5.65377733 ±0.00001059 | — | — | 2016 | |
| Kepler-999b | Transit | — | 0.209+0.058 −0.044 | — | 5.99185702 ±0.00000817 | — | — | 2016 | |
| Kepler-1000b | Transit | — | 0.425+0.03 −0.028 | — | 120.0181272 ±0.0003628 | — | — | 2016 | |
| Planet | Discovery method | Mass (M_{J}) | Radius (R_{J}) | Density (g/cm^{3}) | Orbital period (days) | Semimajor axis (AU) | Orbital eccentricity | Year of confirmation | Ref. |

back to top
