= KOI-868.01 =

Unconfirmed exoplanet in the constellation of Cygnus

Discovery
- Discovery date: 2013
- Detection method: Transit

Orbital characteristics
- Semi-major axis: 0.6534 AU
- Eccentricity: 0
- Orbital period (sidereal): 236
- Inclination: 89.76
- Known satellites: KOI-868.01 I (unconfirmed)
- Star: KOI-868

Physical characteristics
- Mean diameter: 0.945 R_{J} (120,000 km)
- Mass: 0.689 M_{J} (219.1 M_{🜨})
- Temperature: 188 K

KOI-868.01, also known by its Kepler Input Catalog designation KIC 6867155.01, is a Saturn-sized exoplanet candidate that orbits the M-type star KOI-868, located approximately 1,315 light years away in the constellation of Cygnus.

== Host star ==
The planet candidate orbits the dim red dwarf star KOI-868, which has a spectral type of M1V. The star has an apparent visual magnitude of 15.643, and is roughly 1,300 light years away in the constellation of Cygnus. The star has an effective temperature of 3,822 K. KOI-868 has a radius of 0.53 solar radii (R_{☉}; 370,000 km), and has a mass of 0.55 solar masses (M_{☉}; 1.09×10^{30} kg).

== Characteristics ==
KOI-868.01 is similar in size to Saturn with an estimated radius of 0.945 R_{J}, or a diameter of roughly 120,000 kilometers. The unconfirmed planet has a mass of 0.689 M_{J}, or 219.1 M_{🜨}. The potential planet orbits its star in 236 days at a distance of 0.65 astronomical units. The planet candidate is located within the habitable zone of its star, and has an equilibrium temperature of 188 K (−85 °C; −121 °F). The planet was first suggested to exist as a Kepler Object of Interest (KOI) in 2013 after observations with the Kepler Space Telescope using the transit method.

== Existence ==
KOI-868.01 is currently categorized as a planet candidate by the NASA Exoplanet Archive (NEA). In 2026, it was found that KOI-868.01 is an extremely promising candidate, along with several others, and further studies could confirm the existence of this planet.

== Potential ring system ==
In 2018, it was discovered that KOI-868.01 may host rings due to an anomaly during the transits. Using the data from the transit, the study found that the predicted rings potentially extend up to 88,000 kilometers from the surface of the planet. It was found that the hypothetical rings would be stable for over 3 billion years. However, with only two transits, the existence of rings is unlikely, and the anomalies observed is believed to be caused by stellar activity.

== Possible exomoon ==
In 2015, David Kipping discovered using transit timing variations (shortened as TTVs) that a potential exomoon may orbit KOI-868.01 in the Hunt for Exomoons with Kepler (abbreviated as HEK) project. The possible exomoon, which is named KOI-868.01 I, would have a radius of 1.23 R_{🜨}, and a mass of 0.31 M_{🜨}. The candidate exomoon would orbit approximately 0.0221 astronomical units away from the planet. Because KOI-868.01 is located in the habitable zone of its star, this exomoon could potentially be an example of a habitable exomoon similar to 2MASS J1119-1137 I.

== See also ==
- List of exomoon candidates, includes KOI-868.01.
- 2MASS J1119-1137, another system containing a potentially habitable exomoon.
