= CD−35 2722 =

Star system in the constellation Columba

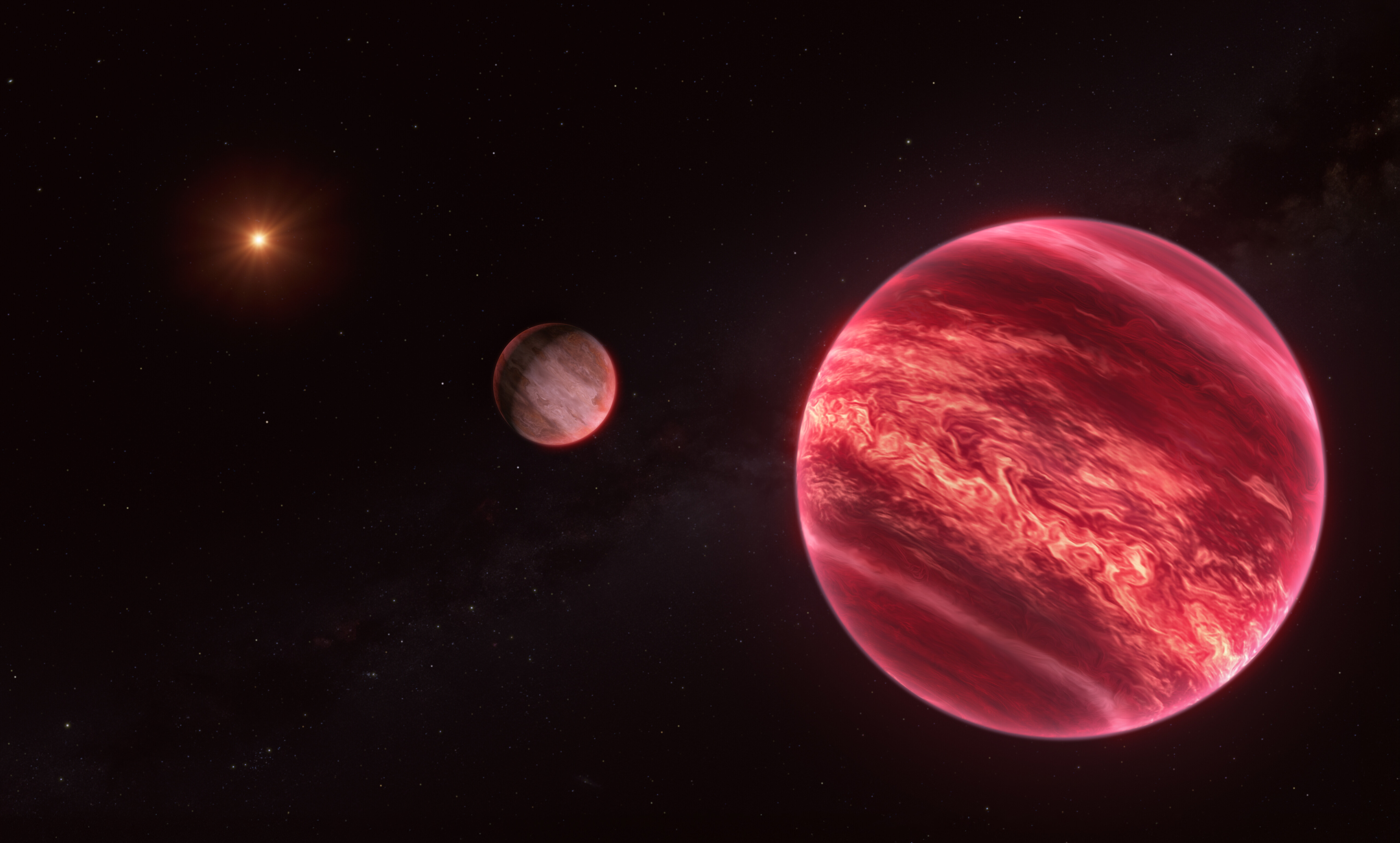
- Artistic representation of CD-35 2722 system Credit: ESO/M. Kornmesser

Observation data Epoch J2000.0 Equinox ICRS
- Constellation: Columba
- Right ascension: 06^{h} 09^{m} 19.208^{s}
- Declination: −35° 49′ 31.07″
- Apparent magnitude (V): 11.083±0.07

Characteristics
- Evolutionary stage: Red dwarf + Brown dwarf
- Spectral type: M1Ve + L4±1
- Variable type: T Tauri

Astrometry
Radial velocity (R_{v})	+31.21±0.68 km/s
Proper motion (μ)	RA: −3.605(14) mas/yr Dec.: −56.077(15) mas/yr
Parallax (π)	44.7203±0.0128 mas
Distance	72.93 ± 0.02 ly (22.361 ± 0.006 pc)

Orbit
Name	CD−35 2722B
Period (P)	1240+330 −290 yr
Semi-major axis (a)	101+15 −14 AU
Eccentricity (e)	0.772+0.049 −0.051
Inclination (i)	141+11 −7°
Longitude of the node (Ω)	259.6+3.4 −7.4°
Argument of periastron (ω) (secondary)	142.2+7.6 −6.6°

Details

A
Mass	0.40±0.05 M_{☉}
Radius	0.559±0.016 R_{☉}
Luminosity	0.054 L_{☉}
Surface gravity (log g)	4.24±0.50 cgs
Temperature	3680±100 K
Metallicity [Fe/H]	0.04±0.05 dex
Rotational velocity (v sin i)	11.95±0.05 km/s
Age	100±50 Myr

B
Mass	29.5+5.1 −4.3 M_{Jup}
Radius	1.55+0.05 −0.06 R_{Jup}
Surface gravity (log g)	4.5±0.5 cgs
Temperature	1700–1900 K
Rotational velocity (v sin i)	9.58+0.25 −0.24 km/s
Age	100±50 Myr

Other designations
- CD−35 2722, PM J06093-3549, TIC 201426753, TYC 7084-794-1, GSC 07084-00794, 2MASS J06091922-3549311, DENIS J060919.2-354931

Database references
SIMBAD	A
- B
Exoplanet Archive	data

CD−35 2722 is a star system located in the constellation of Columba. The system consists of a red dwarf star orbited by a brown dwarf companion, discovered via direct imaging in 2011. The presence of a Jupiter-mass exosatellite orbiting the brown dwarf has been suspected since 2026. The system is a member of the AB Doradus moving group.

== Brown dwarf ==
In 2011, a brown dwarf designated CD−35 2722B was detected at a projected separation of 3.137″±0.005″ from the star. At a distance of 21.3±1.4 pc, this corresponds to a projected distance of 67±4 au. The mass was originally estimated at 31±8 M_{J}, other estimates suggest 37.29±2.18 M_{J} or 29.5+5.1
−4.3 M_{J}. The temperature is in the range 1700–1900 K and the spectral type is L4±1. The chemical composition of the brown dwarf matches closely that of its host star, which may indicate that it formed by gravitational instability rather than core accretion.

The orbit has not been fully constrained but it appears to have a very high eccentricity, exceeding 0.9.

=== Candidate satellite ===
In 2026, radial-velocity monitoring of CD−35 2722B with the CRIRES+ spectrograph on ESO’s Very Large Telescope provided strong evidence for at least one planetary-mass satellite orbiting CD−35 2722B. Radial velocity data from VLT/CRIRES+ revealed a candidate satellite orbiting CD−35 2722 B. The candidate has a minimum mass of 0.918 M_{J} and an orbital period of 171 days.

A two-satellite model fits the radial velocity data equally well; in this model, the second satellite would have a minimum mass of 0.2 M_{J} and orbit with an 87-day period. However, this two-satellite configuration is highly unstable and would likely result in one of the satellites being ejected within 500 years, making the one-satellite model more likely and preferred.

The suspected satellite orbits a brown dwarf rather than a planet. Astronomers are unsure whether to label the unconfirmed object a "moon," as a "moon" is generally defined as orbiting a planet.

The CD−35 2722 B planetary system
Companion (in order from star)	Mass	Semimajor axis (AU)	Orbital period (days)	Eccentricity	Inclination (°)	Radius
(unconfirmed)	≥0.918+0.011 −0.045 M_{J}	0.200+0.001 −0.004	171.112+0.525 −0.363	0.269+0.013 −0.037	—	—

== See also ==
- List of star systems within 70–75 light-years
