= Kepler-553 =

Star in the constellation Lyra

Observation data Epoch J2000.0 Equinox J2000.0
- Constellation: Cygnus
- Right ascension: 19^{h} 54^{m} 12.207^{s}
- Declination: +48° 19′ 56.70″
- Apparent magnitude (V): 15.15

Characteristics
- Evolutionary stage: subgiant
- Spectral type: G9

Astrometry
Radial velocity (R_{v})	−27.32 km/s
Proper motion (μ)	RA: +4.607 mas/yr Dec.: +28.720 mas/yr
Parallax (π)	1.3407±0.0189 mas
Distance	2,430 ± 30 ly (750 ± 10 pc)

Details
Mass	0.889+0.046 −0.036 M_{☉}
Radius	0.902+0.026 −0.021 R_{☉}
Luminosity	0.536±0.041 L_{☉}
Surface gravity (log g)	4.480+0.019 −0.027 cgs
Temperature	5191+76 −78 K
Metallicity [Fe/H]	0.152±0.058 dex
Age	8.8+3.3 −4.0 Gyr

Other designations
- Kepler-553, KOI-433, KIC 10937029, TIC 264508613, 2MASS J19541219+4819568, LAMOST J195412.20+481956.8

Database references
SIMBAD	data
Exoplanet Archive	data

Kepler-553 is a star in the northern constellation of Cygnus, approximately 2,430 light-years from the Solar System. It is a G-type subgiant that hosts two known exoplanets.

== Planetary system ==
Two exoplanets are known to orbit Kepler-553, both gas giants. The inner planet, Kepler-553b, is between Neptune and Saturn in size; the outer, Kepler-553c, is a super-Jupiter in the habitable zone. The planets were discovered by NASA's Kepler space telescope using the transit method, and were confirmed in 2016 by a study that used statistical validation to confirm over 1,000 Kepler candidates. They were later characterized with radial velocity measurements.

=== Kepler-553 b ===
Kepler-553 b is a super-Neptune-sized planet (or a sub-Saturn) orbiting close to its host star. Its mass remains unconstrained beyond an upper limit due to the challenges in detecting its weak radial velocity signal.

=== Kepler-553 c ===
Kepler-553 c is a massive gas giant with a moderate orbital eccentricity, orbiting within the system's habitable zone. Its equilibrium temperature of approximately 251 K makes it a cold giant, potentially analogous to Jupiter but with higher metallicity. The planet's bulk composition is estimated to be about 8% heavy elements by mass, consistent with expectations for a gas giant of its mass.

Prior to its confirmation, this planet was known as KOI-433.02, and a 2011 article from the Planetary Habitability Laboratory included it in a list of exoplanet candidates that could hypothetically host potentially habitable exomoons. There is as yet no evidence of any moons around this planet.

The Kepler-553 planetary system
Companion (in order from star)	Mass	Semimajor axis (AU)	Orbital period (days)	Eccentricity	Inclination	Radius
b	<0.365 M_{J}	0.04766+0.00081 −0.00065	4.0304670(18)	—	88.94+0.67 −0.60°	0.423+0.016 −0.011 R_{J}
c	6.70+0.44 −0.43 M_{J}	0.898+0.015 −0.012	328.24017+0.00039 −0.00040	0.346+0.020 −0.024	89.8314+0.0054 −0.0092°	1.033+0.032 −0.025 R_{J}
