= HD 206893 =

Star system in the constellation Capricornus

Observation data Epoch J2000.0 Equinox ICRS
- Constellation: Capricornus
- Right ascension: 21^{h} 45^{m} 21.905^{s}
- Declination: −12° 47′ 00.06″
- Apparent magnitude (V): 6.69

Characteristics
- Evolutionary stage: Main sequence
- Spectral type: F5V
- B−V color index: 0.439±0.007

Astrometry
| Radial velocity (R_{v}) | −12.45±0.59 km/s |
| Proper motion (μ) | RA: 94.112 mas/yr Dec.: −0.463 mas/yr |
| Parallax (π) | 24.5275±0.0354 mas |
| Distance | 133.0 ± 0.2 ly (40.77 ± 0.06 pc) |
| Absolute magnitude (M_{V}) | 3.77 |

Details
| Mass | 1.32±0.02 M_{☉} |
| Radius | 1.26±0.02 R_{☉} |
| Luminosity | 2.74 L_{☉} |
| Surface gravity (log g) | 4.27±0.15 cgs |
| Temperature | 6,617±46 K |
| Metallicity [Fe/H] | −0.07±0.27 dex |
| Rotation | 0.996±0.003 d |
| Rotational velocity (v sin i) | 32±2 km/s |
| Age | 155±15 Myr |

Other designations
- BD−13°6008, GC 30461, HD 206893, HIP 107412, SAO 164627, PPM 239301

Database references
| SIMBAD | data |

HD 206893 is a young star with a planetary system located in the southern constellation of Capricornus, the sea goat. It has an apparent visual magnitude of 6.69, which is faint enough that it is a challenge to view with the naked eye. Based on parallax measurements, this star is located at a distance of 133 light years from the Sun. It is drifting closer with a heliocentric radial velocity of −11.8 km/s. From the location and velocity of this star, there is a 61.1% probability it is a member of the Argus moving group.

== Observations ==
The stellar classification of HD 206893 is F5V, matching an F-type main-sequence star that is generating energy through hydrogen fusion at its core. Its metallicity – the abundance of elements more massive than helium – is similar to that in the Sun. Due to uncertainties in the age of young F-type dwarfs, the age of the star is not well constrained but is most probably in the range of 3 to 300 million years. Assuming a likely age of about 250 million years, a stellar model of HD 206893 yields a mass 32% greater than the Sun and a radius 26% broader. As a young star, it has a relatively high rate of spin with a projected rotational velocity of 32 km/s.

Data collected during the IRAS mission showed an infrared excess from this star. The presence of a debris disk was confirmed with data from the ISO and Spitzer space missions. Observations with the Atacama Large Millimeter Array show a wide disk extending from inside a radius of 34 au from the host star out to 158±6 au. There is evidence for a density minimum at around 70 au from the star, which most likely a gap with a width of 13+5
−7 au starting at an inner radius of 73+5
−9 au. This opening is suggestive of having been cleared by a planetary-mass companion.

== Planetary system ==
In 2015, direct imaging of the debris disk with the VLT-SPHERE revealed a substellar companion at a physical separation of 10.4 au from the host star. The detection was confirmed ten months later, ruling out a background object. Designated HD 206893 B, the body appears very red in hue, most likely due to nearby dust. It is orbiting inside the inner edge of the debris disk, at an angle of 20.8°+13.6°
−11.2° to the plane of the disk. The estimated mass of this companion is in the range of 12–78 M_{J}, and it is most likely an L-type brown dwarf. Perturbation by this object may be causing collisions within the debris disk. The system was observed with VLT/GRAVITY. The orbit was found to be wider and the mass lower. The researchers find tentative astrometric residuals, which are either systematics or could be caused by an exomoon (HD 206893 B I) with a mass of around 0.4 M_{J} and an orbital period of 0.76 years. Spectroscopy from GRAVITY shows water, but no carbon monoxide for companion B.

In 2023, long-term monitoring of radial velocity variations by the star indicated the presence of an additional inner companion. Designated HD 206893 c, this exoplanet has a mass of 12.7+1.2
−1.0 M_{J} and an orbital separation of 3.53+0.08
−0.06 au, which gives an orbital period of approximately 5.7 years. The mass of HD 206893 c is located near the deuterium–burning limit, which may be impacting the evolution of the object. The precise astrometry of this system provides a more robust age estimate of 155±15 million years.

The HD 206893 planetary system
| Companion (in order from star) | Mass | Semimajor axis (AU) | Orbital period (days) | Eccentricity | Inclination (°) | Radius |
|---|---|---|---|---|---|---|
| c | 11.1+0.4 −0.5 M_{J} | 3.74+0.02 −0.03 | 2,290 d (6.28 yr) | 0.283+0.019 −0.017 | 142.5+0.9 −0.8 | 1.46+0.18 −0.06 R_{J} |
| B | 19.5+1.4 −1.3 M_{J} | 10.75±0.08 | 11,100 d (30.5 yr) | 0.069+0.011 −0.012 | 142.0+0.4 −0.5 | 1.25±0.02 R_{J} |
| debris disk | ≤ 34–158±6 AU | | | | — | — |
| d (candidate) | 0.9 M_{J} | ~74 | — | 0.14^{+0.05}_{−0.04} | — | — |

=== Possible exomoon ===
While investigating HD 206893 B with the GRAVITY instrument at the Very Large Telescope (VLT), signs of a potential very massive exomoon was detected around HD 206893 B. If confirmed, the exomoon's mass should be 40% of Jupiter's mass.
