= WASP-76 =

Star in the Pisces constellation

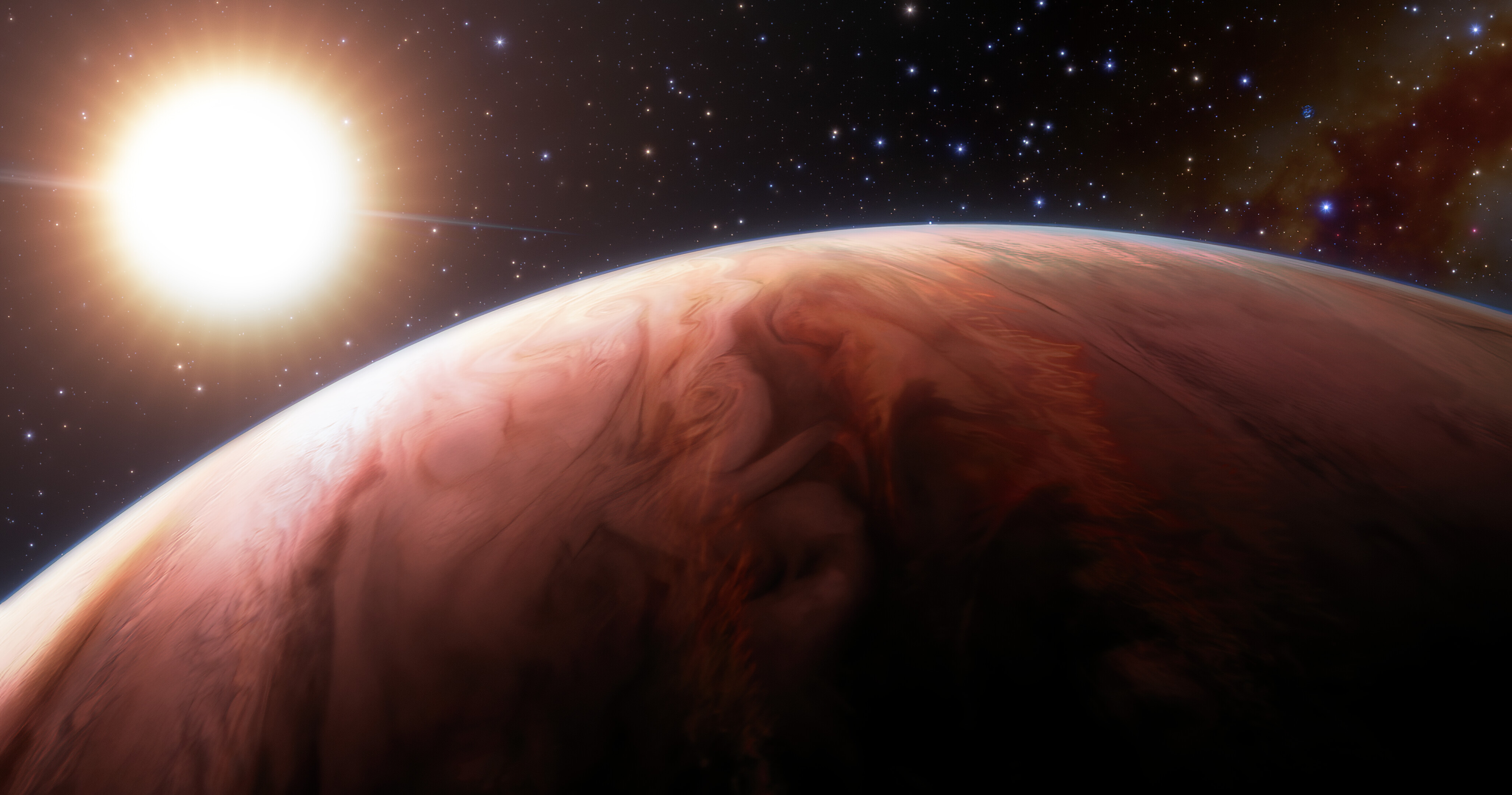
- Artist impression of WASP-76b and WASP-76

Observation data Epoch J2000 Equinox ICRS
- Constellation: Pisces
- Right ascension: 01^{h} 46^{m} 31.8576^{s}
- Declination: 02° 42′ 02.030″
- Apparent magnitude (V): 9.52

Characteristics
- Evolutionary stage: main sequence
- Spectral type: F7
- B−V color index: 0.61
- J−H color index: 0.21
- J−K color index: 0.3

Astrometry
Radial velocity (R_{v})	−1.152±0.0033 km/s
Proper motion (μ)	RA: +45.531 mas/yr Dec.: −40.593 mas/yr
Parallax (π)	5.2899±0.0826 mas
Distance	617 ± 10 ly (189 ± 3 pc)

Orbit
Period (P)	903+316 −416 yr
Semi-major axis (a)	118+27 −39 au
Eccentricity (e)	0.844+0.123 −0.062
Inclination (i)	65.7+13.0 −8.8°
Longitude of the node (Ω)	28+8 −9°
Periastron epoch (T)	2,152,623+148,144 −111,734 BJD
Argument of periastron (ω) (secondary)	333+24 −27°

Details

A
Mass	1.372+0.031 −0.030 M_{☉}
Radius	1.667±0.020 R_{☉}
Luminosity	4.6 L_{☉}
Surface gravity (log g)	4.4±0.1 cgs
Temperature	6,250±100 K
Metallicity [Fe/H]	0.23±0.1 dex
Rotational velocity (v sin i)	3.3±0.6 km/s
Age	5.3^{+6.1}_{−2.9} Gyr

B
Mass	0.672+0.031 −0.030 M_{☉}

Other designations
- WASP-76, 2MASS J01463185+0242019, Gaia DR3 2512326349403275520

Database references
SIMBAD	data

WASP-76, also known as BD+01 316, is a binary star in the constellation of Pisces. The primary is a yellow-white main sequence star, with a mass around 1.37 M_{☉}. The stellar companion has a mass of 0.67 M_{☉}. Both take around 900 years to orbit around each other. The companion was first reported in 2014.

After about five billion years, WASP-76 A has expanded and become more luminous than at the start of its main sequence life, but most probably has not yet reached the subgiant branch.

== Planetary system ==
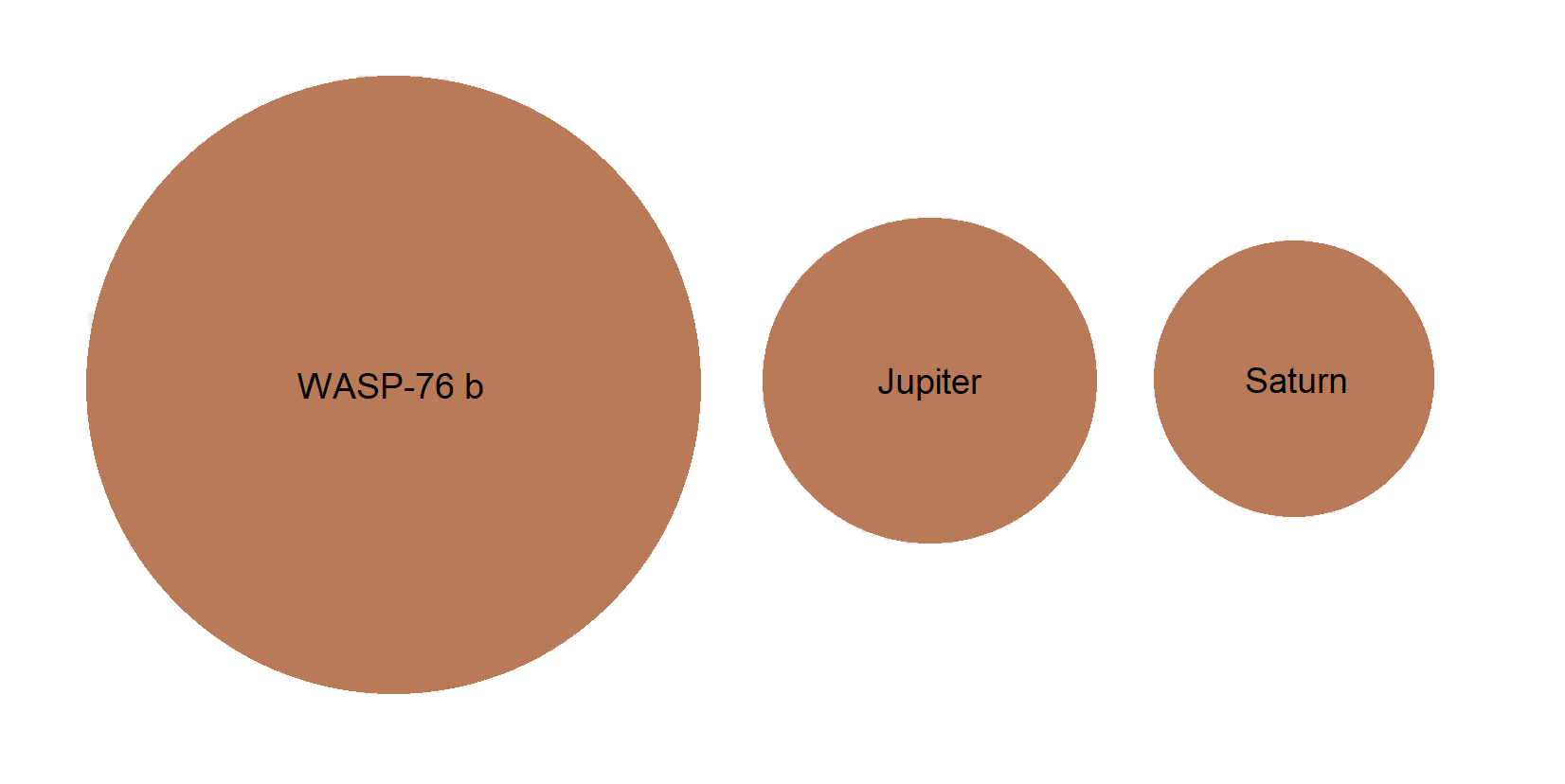
Size comparison of WASP-76 b, Jupiter and Saturn

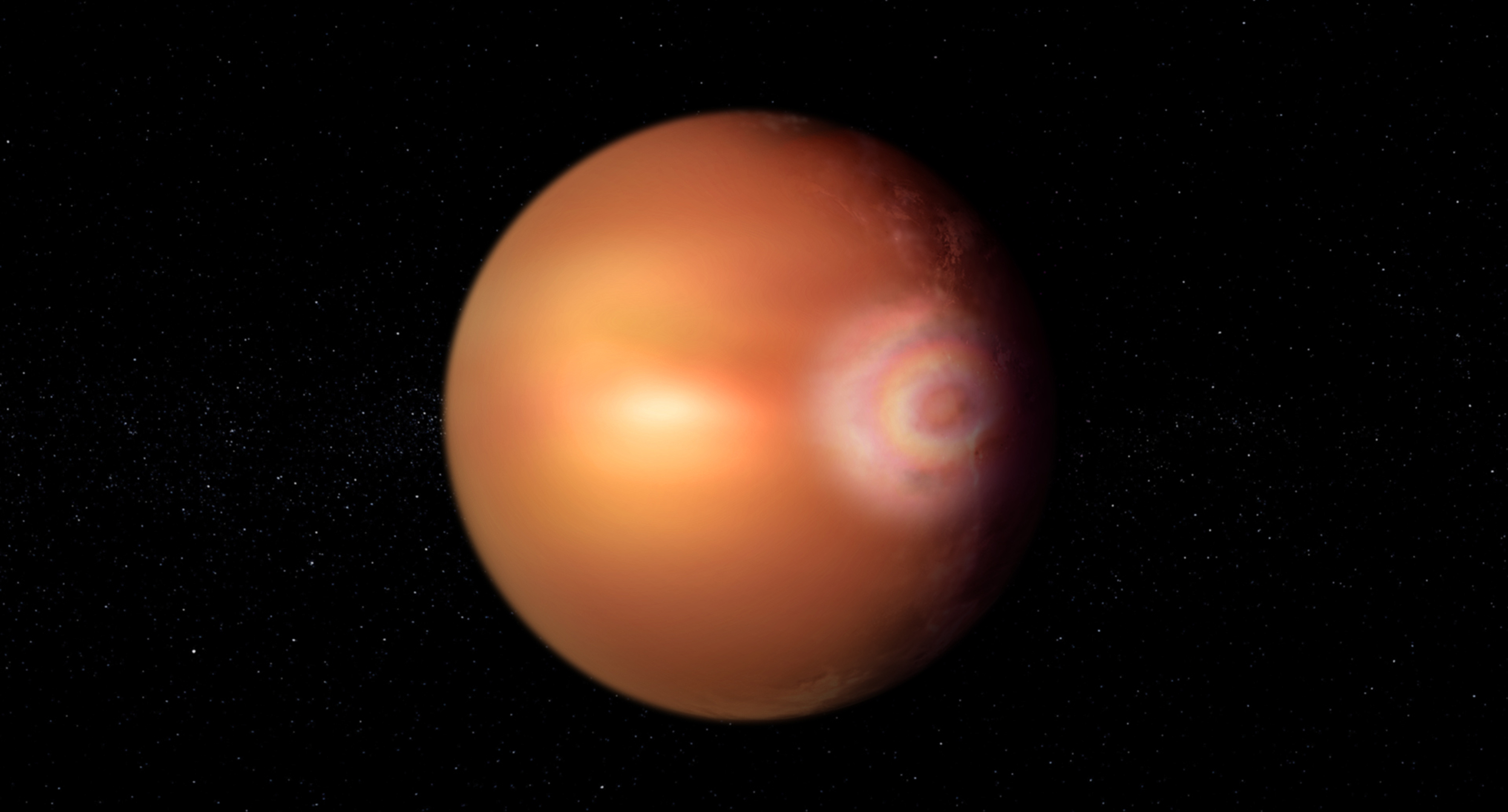
Artistic image of WASP-76b, showing its possible glory effect

The "hot Jupiter" class planet WASP-76b was discovered around WASP-76 in 2013.

Analysis of transit-timing variations suggest an additional planet in the system.

The WASP-76 planetary system
Companion (in order from star)	Mass	Semimajor axis (AU)	Orbital period (days)	Eccentricity	Inclination (°)	Radius
b	0.92 M_{J}	0.0316±0.0002	1.80988132(12)	0.00087±0.00031	87.88±0.16	1.842±0.024 R_{J}
