= WASP-49 =

Star in the constellation Lepus

Observation data Epoch J2000 Equinox ICRS
- Constellation: Lepus
- WASP-49 A
- Right ascension: 06^{h} 04^{m} 21.474^{s}
- Declination: −16° 57′ 55.109″
- Apparent magnitude (V): 11.35
- WASP-49 B
- Right ascension: 06^{h} 04^{m} 21.480^{s}
- Declination: −16° 57′ 57.382″

Characteristics

WASP-49 A
- Evolutionary stage: Main sequence
- Spectral type: G6V

WASP-49 B
- Evolutionary stage: Main sequence
- Spectral type: K

Astrometry

WASP-49 A
Radial velocity (R_{v})	41.81±0.38 km/s
Proper motion (μ)	RA: +54.671 mas/yr Dec.: −19.055 mas/yr
Parallax (π)	5.1315±0.0158 mas
Distance	636 ± 2 ly (194.9 ± 0.6 pc)

WASP-49 B
Proper motion (μ)	RA: +55.154±0.076 mas/yr Dec.: −18.334±0.108 mas/yr
Parallax (π)	5.2287±0.0978 mas
Distance	620 ± 10 ly (191 ± 4 pc)

Position (relative to WASP-49 A)
Angular distance	2.26416±0.00015″
Position angle	177.53314±0.00247°
Projected separation	443 AU

Details

A
Mass	1.003±0.10 M_{☉}
Radius	1.038±0.038 R_{☉}
Luminosity	0.884 L_{☉}
Surface gravity (log g)	4.5±0.1 cgs
Temperature	5,600±150 K
Metallicity [Fe/H]	−0.230±0.070 dex
Rotational velocity (v sin i)	0.90±0.30 km/s
Age	11.9+0.8 −3.2 Gyr

B
Mass	0.337+0.009 −0.024 M_{☉}
Temperature	3454+10 −25 K

Other designations
- WDS J06044-1658AB, TOI-479, TIC 306362738, WASP-49, TYC 5936-2086-1, 2MASS J06042146-1657550

Database references
SIMBAD	A
- B
Exoplanet Archive	data

WASP-49 is a binary star system about 636 light-years (195 parsecs) away in the constellation Lepus. The two stars are separated by 443 AU. The primary is a G-type main-sequence star, with a surface temperature of 5,600 K (5,330 °C; 9,620 °F). WASP-49 is depleted of heavy elements relative to the Sun. It has a metallicity Fe/H index of –0.23, meaning it has 59% the iron level of the Sun.

== Planetary system ==
In 2012, one exoplanet, designated WASP-49b, was discovered around the primary star by a team led by Monika Lendl. This is a hot Jupiter with an equilibrium temperature of 1369±39 K.

In 2017, WASP-49b was found to have an extensive sodium envelope. A study in 2019 using data from the Hubble Space Telescope in near-UV found clear absorption features caused by metals, including magnesium and iron. The gaseous magnesium and iron is not gravitationally bound to the planet, but could be magnetically confined to it. The sodium layer around WASP-49b could be due to a tidally-heated Io-like exomoon. In October 2024, a 5-year study was published indicating that the sodium envelope most likely comes from a distinct body orbiting WASP-49b rather than the star or the planet, although the exact dynamics of the envelope remains to be settled.

The WASP-49 A planetary system
Companion (in order from star)	Mass	Semimajor axis (AU)	Orbital period (days)	Eccentricity	Inclination (°)	Radius
b	0.399+0.029 −0.027 M_{J}	0.0379+0.0010 −0.0011	2.7817387(56)	<0.026	84.89±0.19	1.115±0.047 R_{J}
