= Kepler-409b =

Exoplanet

Discovery
- Discovered by: Kepler space telescope
- Discovery date: 2014
- Detection method: Transit

Designations
- Alternative names: KOI-1925, KIC 9955598

Orbital characteristics
- Semi-major axis: 0.3192 AU
- Eccentricity: <0.69
- Orbital period (sidereal): 68.9583216±0.0000039 d
- Inclination: 86.30±0.13
- Star: Kepler-409

Physical characteristics
- Mean radius: 1.199 R_{🜨}
- Mass: <6 M_{🜨}
- Mean density: <19 g/cm^{3}
- Temperature: 438±7 K

Kepler-409b is a super-Earth orbiting Kepler-409, a G-type main-sequence star. Its orbital period around the star is 69 days. Kepler-409b has a radius 1.199 times that of Earth and a mass less than 6 times that of Earth. Its discovery in 2014 was made through the use of the transit detection method. The transit method was performed by the Kepler space telescope.

== Possible exomoon ==
In 2020, a possible exomoon was discovered from transit timing variations. Follow-up observations deemed it unlikely.
