= Magnesium orthosilicate =

Identifiers
CAS Number	10034-94-3
3D model (JSmol)	Interactive image
ChemSpider	59610
ECHA InfoCard	100.030.089
EC Number	233-112-5
PubChem CID	66225
UNII	33JD0Q1Q6P
CompTox Dashboard (EPA)	DTXSID20143180
- InChI: InChI=1S/2Mg.O4Si/c;;1-5(2,3)4/q2*+2;-4 Key: HCWCAKKEBCNQJP-UHFFFAOYSA-N
- SMILES: [O-][Si]([O-])([O-])[O-].[Mg+2].[Mg+2]

Properties
Chemical formula	Mg_{2}SiO_{4}
Molar mass	140.693 g/mol
Appearance	colorless crystalline solid
Density	3.21 g/cm^{3}
Melting point	1,890 °C (3,430 °F; 2,160 K)
Solubility in water	insoluble

Structure
Crystal structure	orthorhombic

Thermochemistry
Heat capacity (C)	119 J/mol K
Std molar entropy (S^{⦵}_{298})	95 J/mol K
Std enthalpy of formation (Δ_{f}H^{⦵}_{298})	−2172 kJ/mol
- Except where otherwise noted, data are given for materials in their standard state (at 25 °C [77 °F], 100 kPa). Infobox references

Magnesium orthosilicate is a chemical compound with the formula Mg_{2}SiO_{4}. It is the orthosilicate salt of magnesium. It exists as forsterite in nature.

== Production ==
Magnesium orthosilicate is made by the fusion of stoichiometric amounts of magnesium and silicon oxides at 1,900 °C (3,450 °F).
