= MOA-2011-BLG-262L =

Red dwarf in the constellation Sagittarius

Observation data Epoch J2000 Equinox ICRS
- Constellation: Sagittarius
- Right ascension: 18^{h} 00^{m} 23.48^{s}
- Declination: −31° 14′ 42.93″

Characteristics
- Apparent magnitude (K): 22.3

Astrometry
Distance	24,400±3,000 ly (7,490±910 pc)

Details
Mass	0.193±0.029 M_{☉}

Database references
SIMBAD	data

MOA-2011-BLG-262L is a red dwarf with an orbiting exoplanet, both detected through the gravitational microlensing event MOA-2011-BLG-262. The planetary system was once believed to be either an exoplanet with 3.2 times the mass of Jupiter and a exomoon with 0.47 times Earth's mass or a red dwarf with a mass of 0.11 solar masses orbited by a ~17 M_{🜨} planet, but the latter scenario was confirmed in 2024 based on observations of the host star by the Keck telescope, 10 years after the microlensing event.

== Planetary system ==
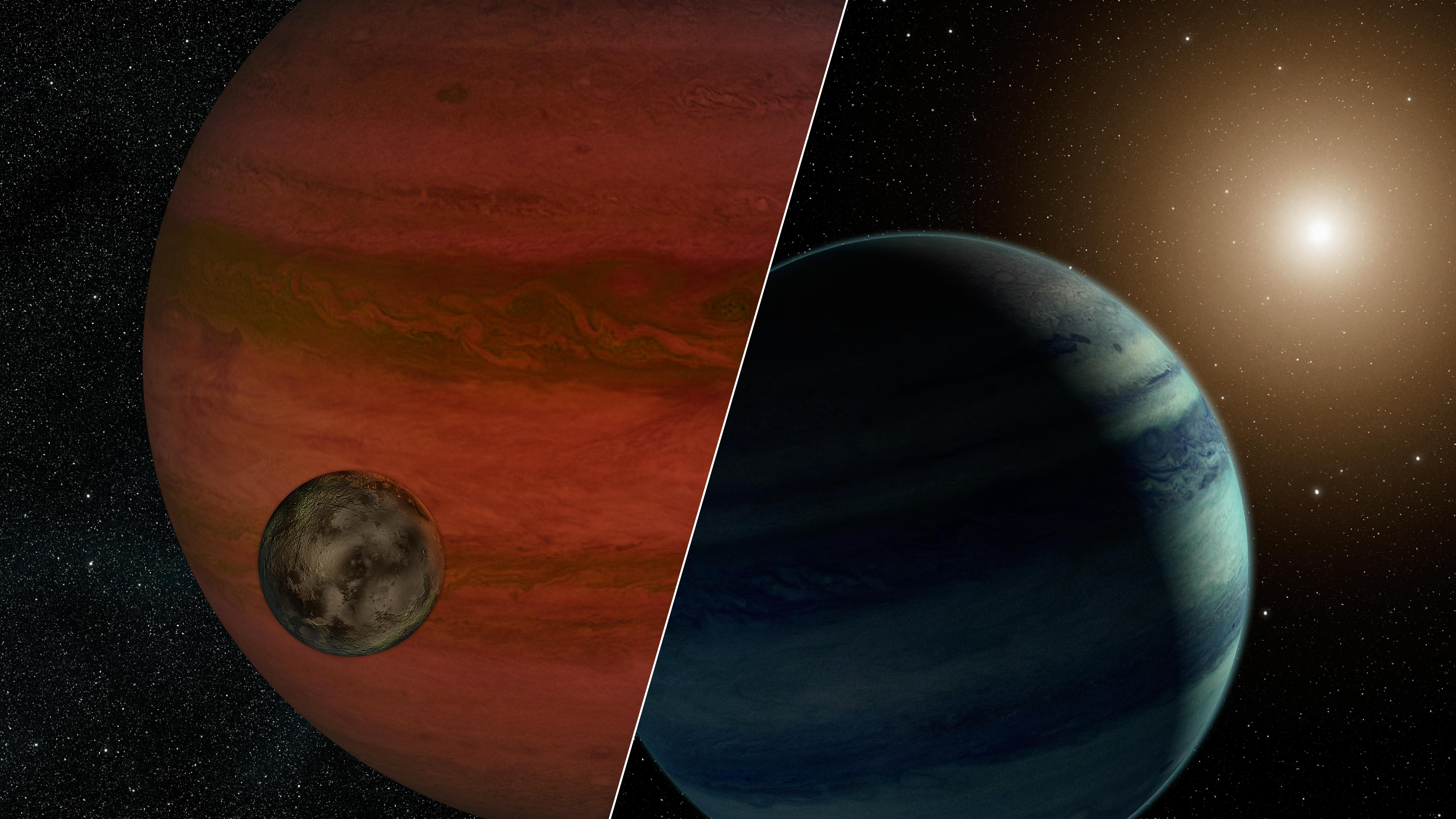
An artist's rendition of the system as a rogue planet with a moon (left) and a star with a planet (right); since 2024, the scenario on the right has been confirmed as the actual system

The system is located 24,400 light-years from Earth, in the constellation Sagittarius. The host star is a red dwarf, with 19% the Sun's mass and a faint apparent magnitude of 22.3 in the K-band. It has a transverse velocity of 541.3±65.75 km/s, the highest ever found for any star with a known exoplanet.

The MOA-2011-BLG-262L planetary system
Companion (in order from star)	Mass	Semimajor axis (AU)	Orbital period (days)	Eccentricity	Inclination (°)	Radius
b	28.92±4.75 M_{🜨}	0.98+0.56 −0.20	—	—	—	—
