= List of nearest known black holes =

This is a list of known black holes that are close to the Solar System.

It is thought that most black holes are solitary, but black holes in binary or larger systems are much easier to detect. Solitary black holes can generally only be detected by measuring their gravitational distortion of the light from more distant objects. As of February 2022, only one isolated black hole has been confirmed, OGLE-2011-BLG-0462, around 5,200 light-years away.

The nearest known black hole is Gaia BH1, which was discovered in September 2022 by a team led by Kareem El-Badry. Gaia BH1 is 1,560 light-years away from Earth in the constellation Ophiuchus.

For comparison, the nearest star to the Sun (Proxima Centauri) is about 4.24 light-years away, and the Milky Way galaxy is approximately 100,000 light-years in diameter.

== List ==
Distance		System					Component			Notes and additional references
(ly)	(kpc)	Designation	Description	Right ascension (Epoch J2000.0)	Declination (Epoch J2000.0)	Discovery date	Designation	Stellar class	Mass (M☉)	Notes and additional references
1,560±10	0.478±0.005	Gaia BH1 (TIC 125470397)	Binary system with orbit t=185.63 d and eccentricity e=0.45	17^{h} 28^{m} 41.09^{s}	−00° 34′ 51.93″	2022	A	BH	9.78	
1,560±10	0.478±0.005	Gaia BH1 (TIC 125470397)	Binary system with orbit t=185.63 d and eccentricity e=0.45	17^{h} 28^{m} 41.09^{s}	−00° 34′ 51.93″	2022	B	G	0.93	
1,840±30	0.5906±0.0058	Gaia BH3 (Gaia DR3 4318465066420528000)	Binary system with orbit t=11.6 yr and eccentricity e=0.7291	19^{h} 39^{m} 18.72^{s}	+14° 55′ 54.2″	2024	A	BH	32.70±0.82	
1,840±30	0.5906±0.0058	Gaia BH3 (Gaia DR3 4318465066420528000)	Binary system with orbit t=11.6 yr and eccentricity e=0.7291	19^{h} 39^{m} 18.72^{s}	+14° 55′ 54.2″	2024	B	G	0.76±0.05	
3,800±80	1.16±0.02	Gaia BH2 (Gaia DR3 5870569352746779008)	Binary system with orbit t=1276.7 d and eccentricity e=0.518	13^{h} 50^{m} 16.728^{s}	−59° 14′ 20.42″	2023	A	BH	8.93	
3,800±80	1.16±0.02	Gaia BH2 (Gaia DR3 5870569352746779008)	Binary system with orbit t=1276.7 d and eccentricity e=0.518	13^{h} 50^{m} 16.728^{s}	−59° 14′ 20.42″	2023	B	K III	1.07	
3,800+2,700 −2,000	1.18+0.82 −0.63	Gaia18ajz	Candidate for isolated black hole detected by microlensing	18^{h} 30^{m} 14.460^{s}	−08° 13′ 12.756″	2024		BH	12.0+14.9 −5.4	Most probable solution parameters shown. Another solution has a mass of 5.6 MSol.
4,700±800	1.44±0.25	A0620-00 (V616 Mon)	Binary star system with orbit t=7.75 h	06^{h} 22^{m} 44.503^{s}	−00° 20′ 44.72″	1986	A	BH	11.0±1.9	Low-mass X-ray binary
4,700±800	1.44±0.25	A0620-00 (V616 Mon)	Binary star system with orbit t=7.75 h	06^{h} 22^{m} 44.503^{s}	−00° 20′ 44.72″	1986	B	K	0.5±0.3	
5,150±590	1.58±0.18	MOA-2011-BLG-191/OGLE-2011-BLG-0462	Isolated black hole detected by microlensing	17^{h} 51^{m} 40.2082^{s}	−29° 53′ 26.50″	2022		BH	7.1±1.3	First confirmed black hole detected via microlensing
5,400+6,900 −1,900	1.7±1.4	GRS 1124-683 (GU Muscae)	Binary star system with orbit t=10.38 h	11^{h} 26^{m} 26.60^{s}	−68° 40′ 32.3″	1991 Jan 20	A	BH	6.95±1.1	
5,400+6,900 −1,900	1.7±1.4	GRS 1124-683 (GU Muscae)	Binary star system with orbit t=10.38 h	11^{h} 26^{m} 26.60^{s}	−68° 40′ 32.3″	1991 Jan 20	B	K	0.9±0.3	
5,720±300	1.7±0.1	XTE J1118+480		11^{h} 18^{m} 11^{s}	48° 02′ 13″	2000	A	BH	6–6.5	
5,720±300	1.7±0.1	XTE J1118+480		11^{h} 18^{m} 11^{s}	48° 02′ 13″	2000	B	M	0.2	
7,300±200	2.25±0.08	Cygnus X-1 (Cyg X-1)	Binary star system with orbit t=5.6 d	19^{h} 58^{m} 21.676^{s}	+35° 12′ 05.78″	1971 April–May	Cyg X-1	BH	15±1	The first X-ray source widely accepted to be a black hole.
7,300±200	2.25±0.08	Cygnus X-1 (Cyg X-1)	Binary star system with orbit t=5.6 d	19^{h} 58^{m} 21.676^{s}	+35° 12′ 05.78″	1971 April–May	HDE 226868	O	30±10	
7,800±460	2.39±0.14	V404 Cygni	Binary star system with orbit t=6.5 d	20^{h} 24^{m} 03.83^{s}	+33° 52′ 02.2″	1989 May 22	A	BH	9	First black hole to have an accurate parallax measurement of its distance from the Solar System
7,800±460	2.39±0.14	V404 Cygni	Binary star system with orbit t=6.5 d	20^{h} 24^{m} 03.83^{s}	+33° 52′ 02.2″	1989 May 22	B	K	0.7	Early K giant star
8,100±1,000	2.49±0.30	GRO J0422+32	Binary star system with orbit t=5.09 h	04^{h} 21^{m} 42.723^{s}	+32° 54′ 26.94″	1992 Aug 5	A	BH	3.97±0.95	
8,100±1,000	2.49±0.30	GRO J0422+32	Binary star system with orbit t=5.09 h	04^{h} 21^{m} 42.723^{s}	+32° 54′ 26.94″	1992 Aug 5	B	M1	0.5±0.1	
8,150	2.5	MACHO-96-BLG-5	Candidate isolated black hole detected by microlensing	18^{h} 05^{m} 2.50^{s}	−27° 42′ 17″	2001		BH	5.30+1.14 −0.96	Very strong candidate, parameters listed are of best fit
8,800±2,300	2.7±0.7	GS 2000+25		20^{h} 02^{m} 50^{s}	+25° 14′ 11″	1988	A	BH	7.5	
8,800±2,300	2.7±0.7	GS 2000+25		20^{h} 02^{m} 50^{s}	+25° 14′ 11″	1988	B	M	0.5	
9,260+6,330 −5,450	2.84+1.94 −1.67	Gaia18cbf	Candidate isolated mass-gap black hole detected by microlensing	16^{h} 04^{m} 38.862^{s}	−41° 06′ 17.32″	2022		BH	2.65+5.09 −1.48	Best fit. Second-best fit has a mass of 1.71 MSol, which would make it a neutron star.
11,000±980	3.4±0.3	Swift J1727.8-1613	Detected via a transient X-ray event	17^{h} 27^{m} 46.0^{s}	−16° 12′ 5.3″	2023	A	BH	3.12±0.10	
11,000±980	3.4±0.3	Swift J1727.8-1613	Detected via a transient X-ray event	17^{h} 27^{m} 46.0^{s}	−16° 12′ 5.3″	2023	B	K4V	<0.78	
11,100±700	3.4±0.2	Cygnus X-3	Binary star system with orbit t=4.8 h	20^{h} 32^{m} 25.766^{s}	+40° 57′ 28.26″	1967	Cyg X-3	BH	2.4+2.1 −1.1	
11,100±700	3.4±0.2	Cygnus X-3	Binary star system with orbit t=4.8 h	20^{h} 32^{m} 25.766^{s}	+40° 57′ 28.26″	1967	V1521 Cyg	WN	10.3+3.9 −2.8	
11,400	3.5	MACHO-98-BLG-6	Candidate isolated mass-gap black hole detected by microlensing	17^{h} 57^{m} 32.80^{s}	−28° 42′ 45″	2001		BH	3.17+0.52 −0.48	Very strong candidate, parameters listed are of best fit
11,900±3,600	3.7±1.1	GRO J1655-40	Binary star system with orbit t = 2.6 d	16^{h} 54^{m} 00.137^{s}	−39° 50′ 44.90″	1994	A	BH	5.31±0.07	
11,900±3,600	3.7±1.1	GRO J1655-40	Binary star system with orbit t = 2.6 d	16^{h} 54^{m} 00.137^{s}	−39° 50′ 44.90″	1994	V1033 Sco	F5IV	1.9±0.3	
15,700	4.8	MACHO-99-BLG-22	Candidate isolated black hole detected by microlensing	18^{h} 05^{m} 05.28^{s}	−28° 34′ 41.70″	2002		BH	7.5	Very strong candidate
25,600±600	7.86±0.2	Sagittarius A*	Supermassive black hole	17^{h} 45^{m} 40.0409^{s}	−29° 0′ 28.118″	1974		BH	4,154,000 ± 14,000	Center of the Galaxy
29,700±2,700	9.1±0.8	4U 1543-475	Binary star system with orbit t = 26.8 h	15^{h} 47^{m} 08.277^{s}	−47° 40′ 10.28″	1971	A	BH	9.4±2.0	
29,700±2,700	9.1±0.8	4U 1543-475	Binary star system with orbit t = 26.8 h	15^{h} 47^{m} 08.277^{s}	−47° 40′ 10.28″	1971	B	A2V	2.7±1.0	

== Nearest black hole record holders ==
This is a succession of black holes that have been known as the nearest black hole.

Nearest black hole titleholders
Date	Distance	Name	Mass	Type	Notes
2022—	1,600 ly (1.5×10^{16} km; 9.4×10^{15} mi)	Gaia BH1	9.62 solar masses (1.913×10^{31} kg; 4.22×10^{31} lb)	Main-sequence star with dormant compact mass binary	First dormant black hole discovered, first Sun-like star in black hole binary system discovered: First detected via positional shifts of visible companion
1986–2022	3,000 ly (2.8×10^{16} km; 1.8×10^{16} mi)	V616 Monocerotis (A0620-00)	5.86 M_{☉} (1.165×10^{31} kg; 2.57×10^{31} lb)	Visible variable star X-ray binary system	First observed in X-rays
1975–1986	6,070 ly (5.74×10^{16} km; 3.57×10^{16} mi)	Cygnus X-1	14.8 M_{☉} (2.94×10^{31} kg; 6.5×10^{31} lb)	X-ray binary system	First black hole discovered: first observed in 1964 in X-rays, first speculated as black hole in 1972, first confirmed black hole in 1975, accepted as a black hole by 1990

== See also ==
- List of black holes
- List of most massive black holes
- Lists of astronomical objects
- List of nearest stars and brown dwarfs
- NGC 3201 – a globular cluster with many black holes
- NGC 7727 – a galaxy with the closest confirmed binary black hole at 89 million light-years away
