= Gaia BH1 =

Binary system containing the closest known black hole to Earth

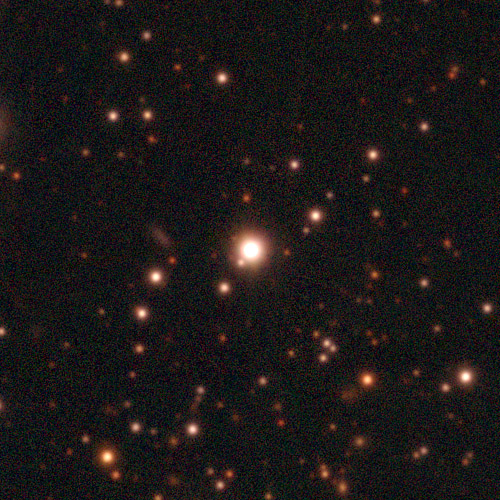
- Pan-STARRS image of Gaia BH1 (star at the center)

Observation data Epoch J2000 Equinox ICRS
- Constellation: Ophiuchus
- Right ascension: 17^{h} 28^{m} 41.09661^{s}
- Declination: −00° 34′ 51.5234″

Characteristics

Sun-like star
- Evolutionary stage: Main sequence
- Spectral type: G
- Apparent magnitude (G): 13.77

Black hole
- Evolutionary stage: Stellar black hole

Astrometry
Radial velocity (R_{v})	23.03±2.63 km/s
Proper motion (μ)	RA: −7.70±0.020 mas/yr Dec.: −25.85±0.027 mas/yr
Parallax (π)	2.09±0.02 mas
Distance	1,560 ± 10 ly (478 ± 5 pc)

Orbit
Period (P)	185.387±0.003 d
Semi-major axis (a)	1.40±0.01 AU
Eccentricity (e)	0.43230±0.00002
Inclination (i)	126.8±0.2°
Longitude of the node (Ω)	97.0±0.7°
Periastron epoch (T)	2457387.9±0.7
Argument of periastron (ω) (secondary)	16.509±0.003°

Details

Sun-like star
Mass	0.93±0.05 M_{☉}
Radius	0.99±0.05 R_{☉}
Luminosity (bolometric)	1.06±0.04 L_{☉}
Surface gravity (log g)	4.55±0.16 cgs
Temperature	5850±50 K
Metallicity [Fe/H]	−0.2±0.05 dex
Rotational velocity (v sin i)	<3.5 km/s

Black hole
Mass	9.27±0.10 M_{☉}

Other designations
- Gaia BH1, Gaia DR3 4373465352415301632

Database references
SIMBAD	data

Gaia BH1 (Gaia DR3 4373465352415301632) is a binary system consisting of a G-type main-sequence star and a stellar-mass black hole, located about 1,560 light-years (478 pc) away from the Solar System in the constellation of Ophiuchus. As of 2026, it is the nearest known system that astronomers are reasonably confident contains a black hole, followed by Gaia BH3, Gaia BH2 and A0620-00.

== Characteristics ==
Illustration of the orbits of the sun-like star (blue circle) and the stellar black hole (red circle) in Gaia BH1. Note that the star and black hole are not to scale.

The star and black hole orbit each other with a period of 185.387 days and an eccentricity of 0.4323. The star is similar to the Sun, with about 0.93 M_{☉} and 0.99 R_{☉}, and a temperature of about 5,850 K (5,580 °C; 10,070 °F), while the black hole has a mass of about 9.62 M_{☉}. Given this mass, the black hole's Schwarzschild radius should be about 28 km (17 mi).

== Discovery ==
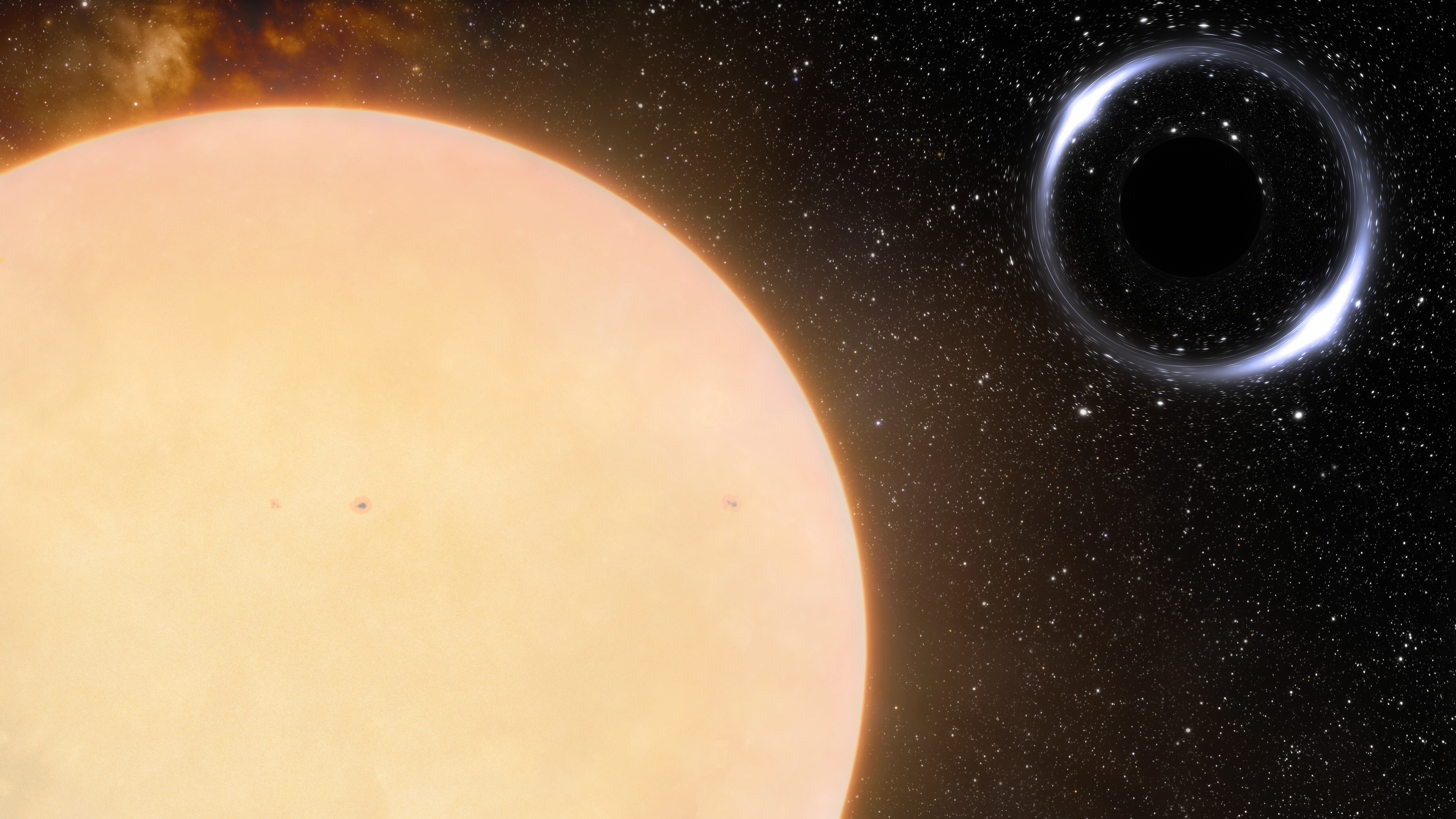
Artist's impression of the Sun-like star (left) and black hole (top right) in the Gaia BH1 system

Gaia BH1 was discovered in 2022 via astrometric observations with Gaia, and also observed via radial velocity. The discovery team found no astrophysical scenario that could explain the observed motion of the G-type star, other than a black hole. The system differs from "black hole impostors" such as LB-1 and HR 6819 in that the evidence for a black hole does not depend on the mass of the star or the inclination of the orbit, and there is no evidence of mass transfer. The discovery team also found a second system that is a candidate for containing a black hole, which was also reported by another team of astronomers, and was confirmed in 2023 as Gaia BH2.

The black hole was also independently detected by a second team, who found slightly different parameters.

== See also ==
- List of nearest known black holes
- Gaia BH2
- Gaia BH3
- GRS 1915+105
- OGLE-2011-BLG-0462
- VFTS 243

Records
Preceded by A0620-00	Least distant black hole 2022—present	Succeeded by None
