= LB-1 =

Binary star system in the constellation Gemini

Observation data Epoch J2000 Equinox ICRS
- Constellation: Gemini
- Right ascension: 06^{h} 11^{m} 49.0763^{s}
- Declination: +22° 49′ 32.686″
- Apparent magnitude (V): 11.51

Characteristics
- Spectral type: B3Ve
- U−B color index: −0.29
- B−V color index: +0.28

Astrometry
Proper motion (μ)	RA: −0.067 mas/yr Dec.: −1.889 mas/yr
Parallax (π)	0.4403±0.0856 mas
Distance	approx. 7,000 ly (approx. 2,300 pc)

Orbit
Period (P)	78.80±0.01 d
Eccentricity (e)	0.0±0.01
Semi-amplitude (K_{1}) (primary)	52.9±0.1 km/s
Semi-amplitude (K_{2}) (secondary)	11.2±1.0 km/s

Details

stripped helium star
Mass	1.5±0.4 M_{☉}
Radius	5.4 R_{☉}
Luminosity	630 L_{☉}
Surface gravity (log g)	3.0±0.2 cgs
Temperature	12700±500 K
Rotational velocity (v sin i)	7±2 km/s

Be star
Mass	7±2 M_{☉}
Radius	3.7 R_{☉}
Luminosity	1,260 L_{☉}
Surface gravity (log g)	4.0±0.3 cgs
Temperature	18000±2000 K
Rotational velocity (v sin i)	300±50 km/s

Other designations
- TIC 45796991, GSC 01877-00743, 2MASS J06114907+2249326

Database references
SIMBAD	data

LB-1 is a binary star system in the constellation Gemini. In 2019, a paper in Nature proposed that the system contained an unusually massive stellar black hole outside of ordinary single stellar evolution parameters. However, analyses in 2020 found the original 2019 conclusion to be incorrect. Some researchers now believe the system consists of a stripped B-type star and a massive rapidly rotating Be star.

== Star ==
The optically observed star, LB-1 A, or LS V+22 25, is a B-type star nine times the mass of the Sun and located at least 7,000 light-years (2,100 pc) from Earth. It was found to exhibit radial velocity variations by Chinese astronomers using the Large Sky Area Multi-Object Fiber Spectroscopic Telescope (LAMOST) and the radial-velocity method to search for such wobbly stars.

The astronomers observed the star orbiting an unseen companion every 78.9 days, in what researchers described as a "surprisingly circular" orbit. Follow-up observations using the Gran Telescopio Canarias in Spain and the W. M. Keck Observatory in the United States better defined the findings.

The parallax to LB-1 has been published in Gaia Data Release 2, implying a distance around 2,300 pc. The observed spectral properties of the star are inconsistent with those expected for an ordinary main sequence B-type star at this distance.

A separate spectroscopic analysis of the star suggests that instead of a B-type main sequence star as had been indicated, LB-1 A is more likely a stripped helium star (whose spectrum is very similar) with only ~1 M_{☉}, if at the distance determined by the Gaia satellite.

An additional spectroscopic analysis utilised multi-epoch spectroscopy and disentangling techniques and found that LB-1 comprises two non-degenerate stars: a rapidly rotating B-type star with a disk (a Be star) and a slowly rotating stripped helium star.

== Unseen companion ==
The unseen companion to the star was discovered by measuring the radial velocity shifts of its companion star. If it is a black hole, this would mark the first time a stellar black hole was discovered without observation of its X-ray emissions.

If the distance from parallax is ignored, and the star is assumed to be an ordinary main sequence B-type star, the unseen companion LB-1 B or LB-1 *, could be hypothesized to be a black hole, with a mass of about 70 solar masses, more than twice the mass as the maximum predicted by most current theories of stellar evolution. It would be in the stellar-mass black hole range, below the size of intermediate-mass black holes; however, it would fall in the pair-instability gap of black hole sizes, whereby sufficiently massive black hole progenitor stars undergo pair-instability supernovae and completely disintegrate, leaving no remnant behind. LB-1 would be the first black hole discovered in the mass gap range. The companion mass would be high enough that anything other than a black hole would be expected to be easily detected. According to one of the researchers, "This discovery forces us to re-examine our models of how stellar-mass black holes form [...] This remarkable result, along with the LIGO-Virgo detections of binary black hole collisions during the past four years, really points towards a renaissance in our understanding of black hole astrophysics."

Alternatively, the evidence for the star to be a stripped helium star reduces the mass estimate of the compact object to as little as ~2–3 M_{☉} and raises the possibility of a neutron star.

A revised multiepoch spectroscopic study of LB-1 has revealed that LB-1 does not contain a black hole at all. Instead, it comprises a rapidly rotating Be star and a slowly-rotating helium star. The system was proposed to have formed through a past mass-transfer event. In this framework, the stripped helium star was originally the more massive star and has therefore evolved faster than its companion. After leaving the main sequence, the progenitor star transferred mass to its companion, which became the massive rapidly rotating Be star we see today.

== See also ==
- HR 6819
- Stellar vampirism
- List of black holes
- List of nearest black holes
