= CA79 =

CA79 or CA-79 may refer to:

- California State Route 79, a state highway in the US state of California
- Sekigahara Station, a railway station in Sekigahara, Japan (station code CA79)
- Caldwell 79, a star cluster
