= BH3 =

BH3 could refer to

- The molecule borane, which has a chemical formula of BH_{3}.
- The Bcl-2 homology domain 3.
- BH3, the Chinese abbreviation for Honkai Impact 3rd (Chinese: 崩坏3; pinyin: Bēng Huài 3)
- BH^{3}, abbreviation for third edition of Biblia Hebraica (Kittel)
- Gaia BH3, a binary system consisting of a K2 star and a probable black hole.
