= A0620-00 =

Binary star in the constellation Monoceros

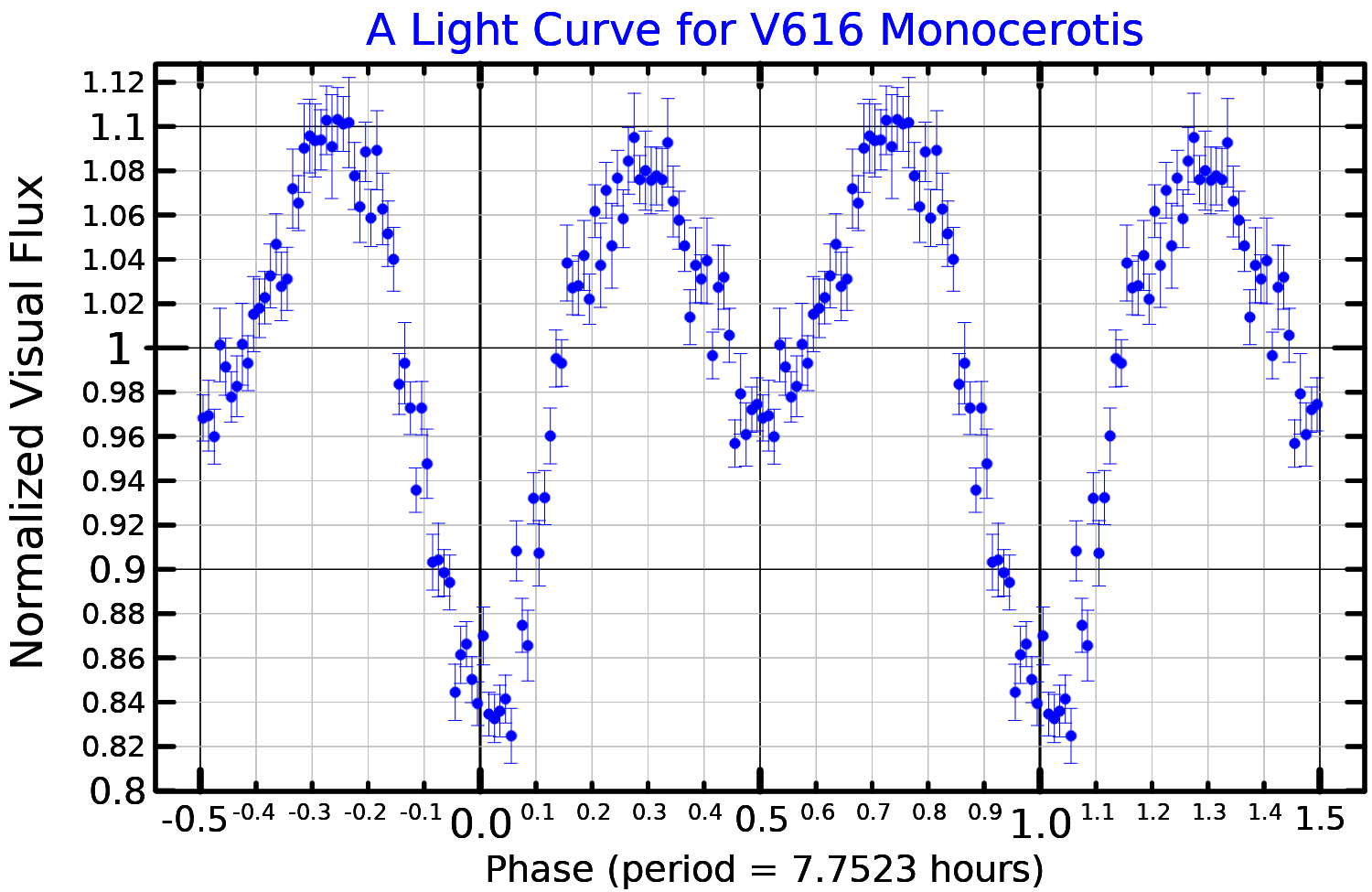
- A visual band light curve for V616 Monocerotis, adapted from van Grunsven et al. (2017)

Observation data Epoch J2000 Equinox ICRS
- Constellation: Monoceros
- Right ascension: 06^{h} 22^{m} 44.542^{s}
- Declination: −00° 20′ 44.29″
- Apparent magnitude (V): 11.2

Characteristics
- Evolutionary stage: Black hole + main sequence
- Spectral type: K2 V
- Variable type: X-ray nova, Ellipsoidal

Astrometry
| Radial velocity (R_{v}) | −5±12 km/s |
| Proper motion (μ) | RA: −0.439 mas/yr Dec.: −5.138 mas/yr |
| Parallax (π) | 0.6969±0.1168 mas |
| Distance | approx. 4,700 ly (approx. 1,400 pc) |

Orbit
| Period (P) | 7.75234±0.00010 hr |
| Inclination (i) | 50.98±0.87° |
| Periastron epoch (T) | JD 2446082.7481±0.0008 |
| Semi-amplitude (K_{1}) (primary) | 457±8 km/s |

Details

Black hole
| Mass | 5.86±1.24 M_{☉} |

Star
| Mass | 0.34±0.03 M_{☉} |
| Radius | 1.057 R_{☉} |
| Luminosity | 0.44 L_{☉} |
| Surface gravity (log g) | 5.0 cgs |
| Temperature | 5,000 K |
| Metallicity [Fe/H] | 0.0 dex |
| Rotational velocity (v sin i) | 83.8±1.9 km/s |

Other designations
- 1A 0620-00, INTREF 297, Nova Mon 1917, Nova Mon 1975, Mon X-1, V616 Mon

Database references
| SIMBAD | data |

A0620-00 (abbreviated from 1A 0620-00) is a binary star system in the constellation of Monoceros, with an apparent magnitude of 18.3.

It consists of two objects. The first is a K-type main-sequence star. The second object cannot be seen, but based on its calculated mass of about 6 M_{☉}, it is too massive to be a neutron star and must therefore be a stellar-mass black hole. The two objects orbit each other every 7.75 hours. At a distance of roughly 3,300 light-years (1,000 parsecs) away, the black hole of A0620-00 would be one of the nearest known black holes to the Solar System, closer than GRO J1655-40.

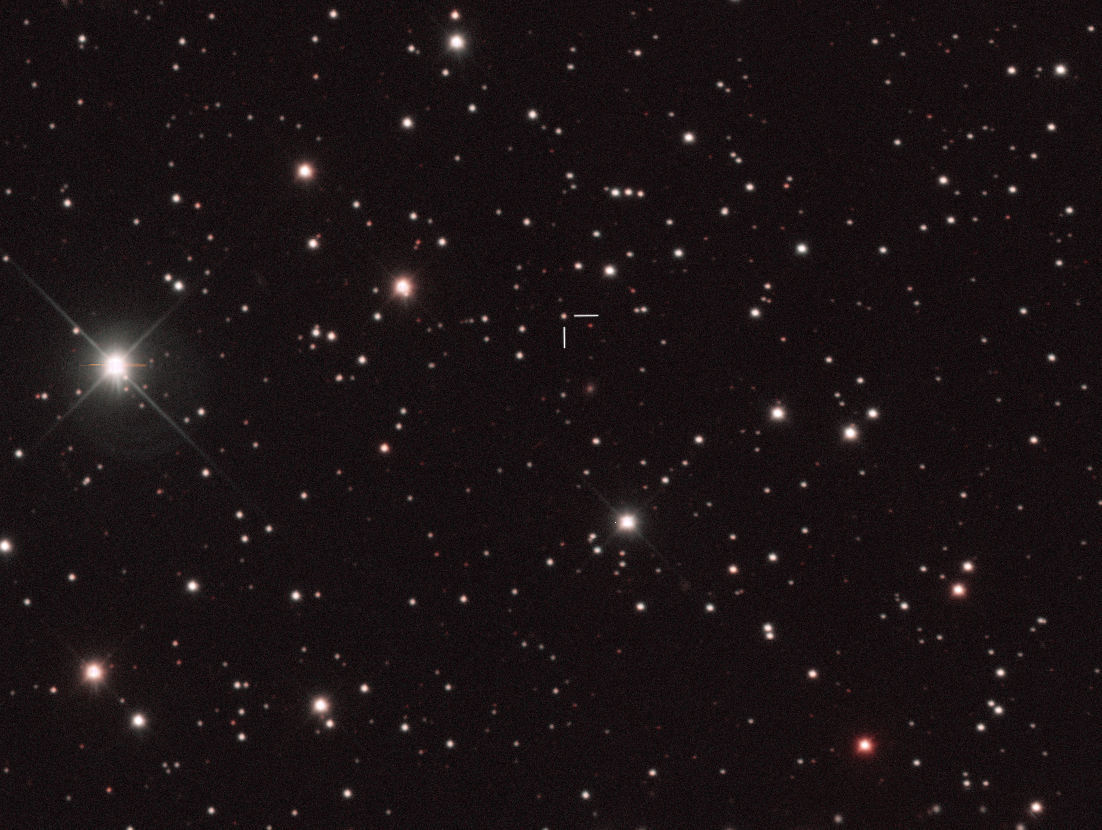
This image of A0620-00 was created from Sloan Digital Sky Survey data in visible and infrared light (filters u,g,i,z) and spans roughly 8 arcminutes.

A0620-00 has undergone two X-ray outbreaks. The first one was in 1917. The second burst, in 1975, was detected by the Ariel 5 satellite. During that time, A0620-00 was the brightest X-ray point source, and had a maximum apparent visual magnitude of 11.2. It is now classified as an X-ray nova. Its black hole nature was determined in 1986.

The black hole in A0620-00 pulls matter from the K-type star into an accretion disk. The accretion disk emits significant amounts of visible light and X-rays. Because the K-type star has been pulled into an ellipsoidal shape, the amount of surface area visible, and thus the apparent brightness, changes from the Earth's perspective. A0620-00 also bears the variable star designation V616 Monocerotis.

== Stephen Hawking memorial broadcast ==
On 15 June 2018, a signal was transmitted from the European Space Agency big radio antenna at Cebreros Station (77 kilometers west of Madrid, Spain), in memory of Stephen Hawking, who died on 14 March 2018, and his work on the physics of black holes. The broadcast will travel the 3,457-light-year distance at the speed of light and will arrive in the year 5475; this will be the first-ever human interaction with a currently known black hole. 1A 0620-00 was chosen for this broadcast as it was the closest known black hole to Earth at the time. The message was one of peace and hope according to his family.

Records
| Preceded by Cygnus X-1 | Least distant black hole 1986—2022 | Succeeded by Gaia BH1 |
