= HR 6819 =

Star system in the constellation of Telescopium

- Location of HR 6819 (red circle) in the SW corner of the southern constellation of Telescopium

Observation data Epoch J2000.0 Equinox ICRS
- Constellation: Telescopium
- Right ascension: 18^{h} 17^{m} 07.53243^{s}
- Declination: −56° 01′ 24.0576″
- Apparent magnitude (V): 5.36 (5.32 to 5.39)

Characteristics
- Evolutionary stage: stripped giant + main sequence
- Spectral type: B3IIIpe or B3II/III
- B−V color index: −0.050±0.018
- Variable type: Be

Astrometry
Radial velocity (R_{v})	+9.13±0.78 km/s
Proper motion (μ)	RA: −4.021±0.111 mas/yr Dec.: −13.071±0.104 mas/yr
Parallax (π)	2.7122±0.1187 mas
Distance	964±22 ly (295.6±6.6 pc)
Absolute magnitude (M_{V})	−1.47

Orbit
Primary	Stripped B giant
Secondary	Be star
Period (P)	40.32640±0.00094 d
Semi-major axis (a)	0.3794±0.0079 AU
Eccentricity (e)	0.0288±0.0043
Inclination (i)	39.38±0.69°
Longitude of the node (Ω)	25.7±1.5°
Argument of periastron (ω) (secondary)	111.2±6.6°
Semi-amplitude (K_{1}) (primary)	61.07±0.66 km/s
Semi-amplitude (K_{2}) (secondary)	4.0±0.8 km/s

Details

Stripped B giant
Mass	0.270±0.056 M_{☉}
Radius	4.4±0.4 R_{☉}
Luminosity	1,122+291 −231 L_{☉}
Surface gravity (log g)	2.8±0.2 cgs
Temperature	16,000±1,000 K
Rotational velocity (v sin i)	50±1 km/s

Be star
Mass	4.24±0.31 M_{☉}
Radius	3.9±0.7 R_{☉}
Luminosity	2,239+580 −460 L_{☉}
Surface gravity (log g)	4.0±0.3 cgs
Temperature	20,000±2,000 K
Rotational velocity (v sin i)	180±10 km/s
Age	50 Myr

Other designations
- QV Tel, CD−56°7256, FK5 1474, GC 24906, HD 167128, HIP 89605, HR 6819, SAO 245369

Database references
SIMBAD	data

HR 6819, also known as HD 167128 or QV Telescopii (abbreviated QV Tel), is a double star system in the southern constellation of Telescopium. It is in the south-western corner of the constellation, near Pavo to the south and Ara to the west. The system appears as a variable star that is dimly visible to the naked eye with an apparent magnitude that ranges from 5.32 down to 5.39, which is comparable to the maximum brightness of the planet Uranus. It is about 1,120 light years from the Sun, and is drifting farther away at a rate of 9.4 km/s. Due to its location in the sky, it is visible only to observers south of 33°N latitude.

A May 2020 study hypothesized that the system contained two stars and a black hole, which would have been the closest known black hole, and the first one in a system visible to the naked eye. A study in July of the same year concluded that rather than a triple system it was much more likely to be a black hole and a star orbiting at one distance from here and another star at a different distance. Three further papers in 2020 and one in 2022 concluded that HR 6819 is simply a binary system with two main-sequence stars and no black hole at all.

== Nomenclature ==
HR 6819 is the Bright Star Catalogue designation for this star. It also has the Henry Draper Catalogue designation HD 167128 and the Hipparcos designation HIP 89605. The General Catalogue of Variable stars includes this system as a variable similar to but not properly of the Gamma Cassiopeiae type, with the variable star designation QV Telescopii, indicating that it is the 330th confirmed variable star (excluding stars with Bayer designations) in the constellation Telescopium.

== History of discoveries ==
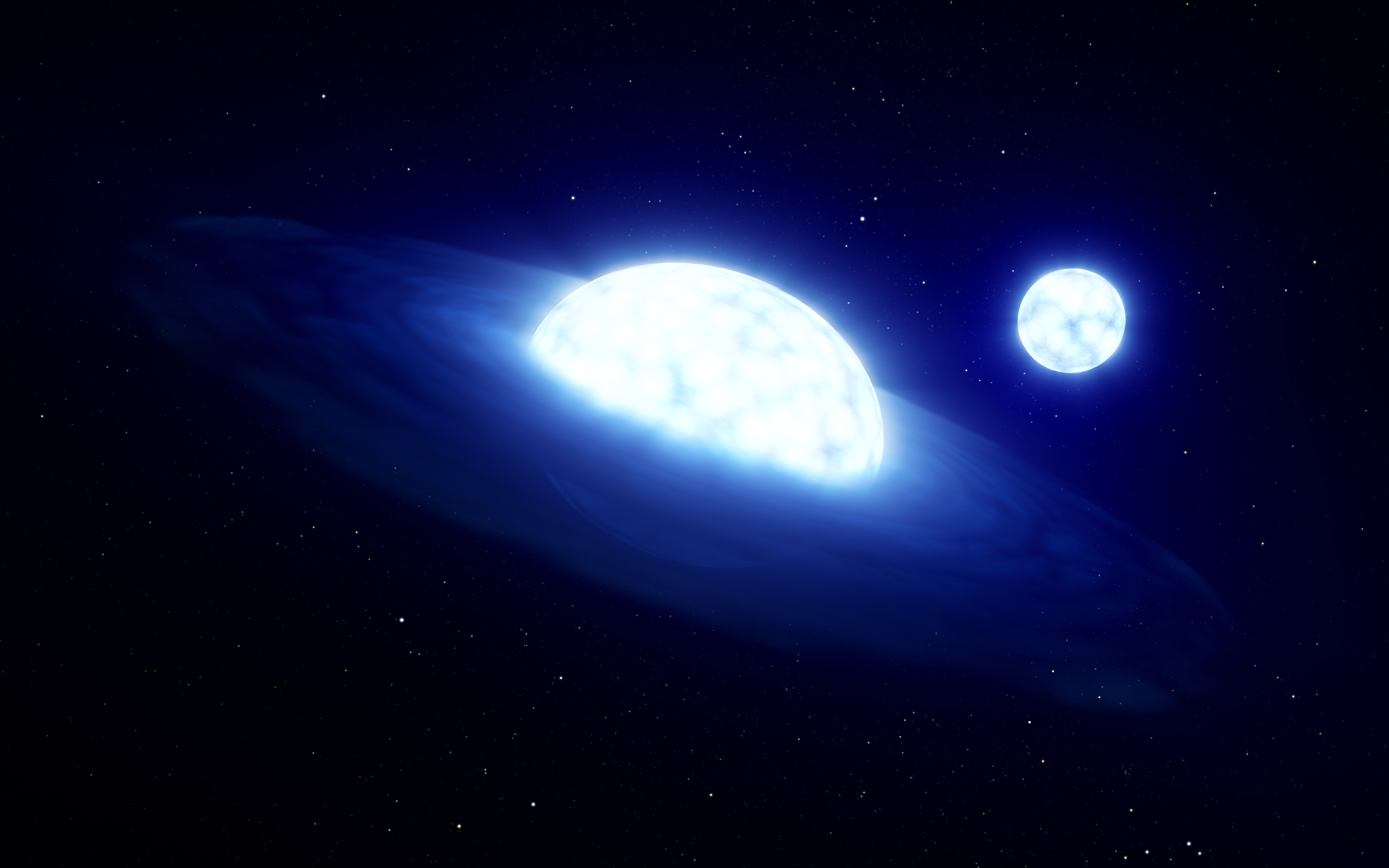
An artist's depiction of the HR 6819 binary star system

HR 6819 was originally considered a single star but it was noted by astronomers Dachs and Slettebak that its absorption spectrum displays characteristics of both Be and B3III stars. It was discovered to be a variable star in 1996, when the Hipparcos data was analysed. In 2003, Monika Maintz concluded that the spectrum of HR 6819 contained the signatures of two stars, though there were not enough observations to deduce an orbital period. Further observations by Rivinius et al. in 2009 were able to disentangle the spectra of the two stars, and the same team conducted thorough radial velocity measurements in 2019 and proposed the presence of an unseen stellar-mass black hole within the system. This triple star hypothesis was challenged in 2020 by Mohammadtaher Safarzadeh, Sivia Toonen, and Abraham Loeb.

According to the interpretation of Rivinius et al. in 2019, HR 6819 was a hierarchical triple containing a classical Be star in a wide orbit of unknown period around an inner 40.3 day binary consisting of a B3 III star and a non-emitting (non-accreting) black hole (≥5±0.4 M_{☉}), designated Ab. Assuming that the two stars have similar masses would mean that there is a third, invisible, body in the system, as the other component in the 40-day orbit. Analysis of the orbital parameters then indicated that the third body was so massive that it could only be a black hole.

However, later work found another explanation, namely that the moving star is actually much lighter, but emitting a similar amount of light. In that case there is no need to invoke the presence of a black hole. This explanation is supported by the detection of motion in the hydrogen disk surrounding the other star, with the 40-day period. The model with a Be star and a stripped giant star, but no black hole, has been confirmed in a further paper published in 2022.

== System ==
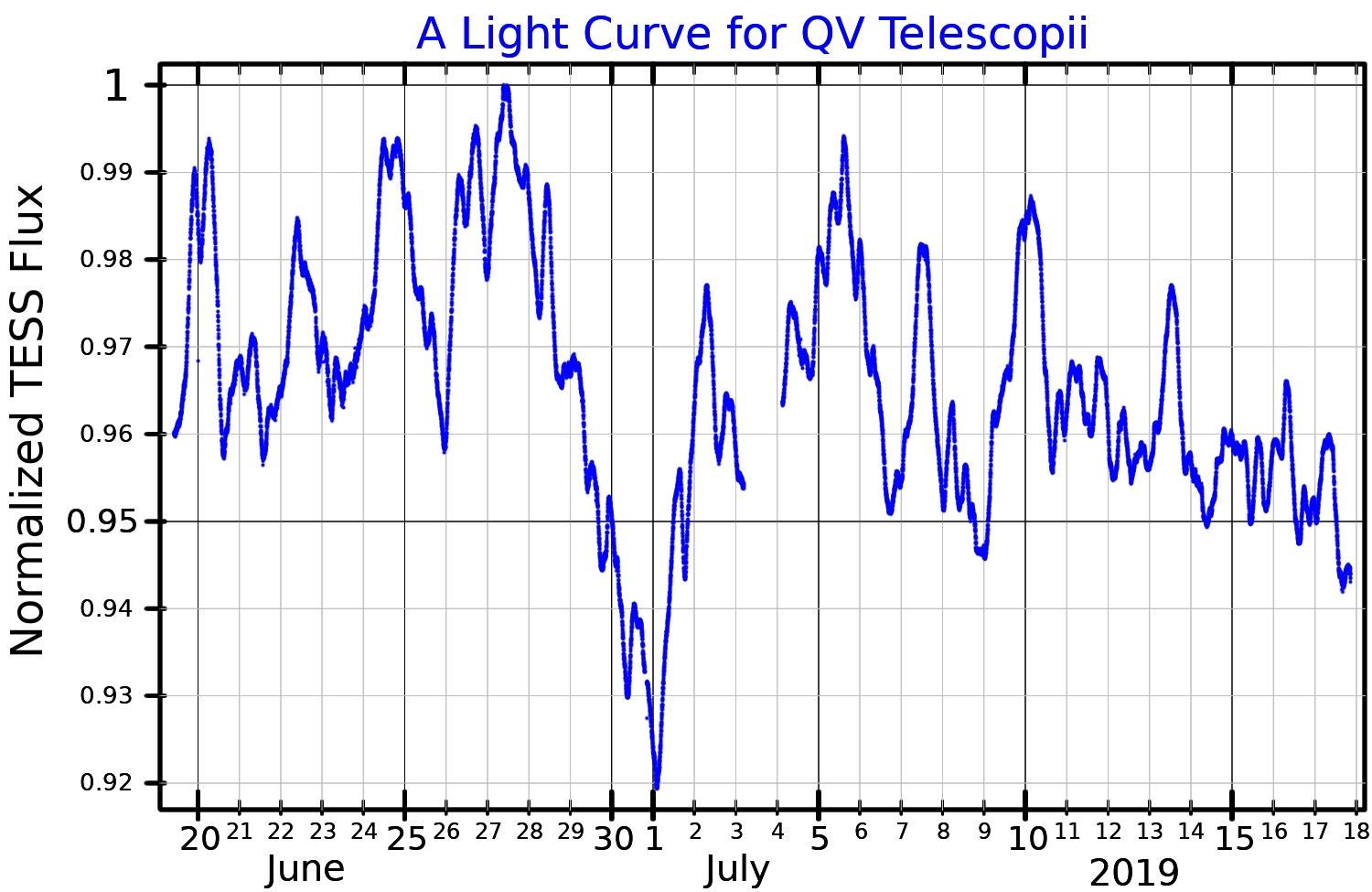
A light curve for QV Telescopii, plotted from TESS data

The spectrum of HR 6819 contains both narrow and broadened lines. The broad lines originate from a rapidly-rotating Be star (a B-class star with emission lines in its spectrum), while the narrow lines are from a more slowly-rotating B-class star. The radial velocity variations of the lines indicate that the normal B-class star is in a 40-day orbit, but the Be star does not show detectable radial velocity oscillation.

Although the HR 6819 system has been described as a member of the Sco OB2 association of co-moving stars, a more recent analysis indicates it is an older system and not part of the association.

=== B-class giant ===
One component in the system is a B3 III blue star. If it were a normal star of this type, it would have a mass of approximately 6 M_{☉}, but if it is a stripped-down helium star it has a mass of around 0.5 M_{☉}.

The spectral type of this component is well-defined at about B3 from the distinct narrow lines in the composite spectrum. Its temperature is around 16,000 K.

=== Be star ===
The second stellar component is a Be star with a stellar classification of B3IIIpe. The 'e' suffix indicates emission lines in its spectrum. It is a rapidly rotating blue-white star with a hot decretion disk surrounding it. It is estimated to be 50 million years old, with a projected rotational velocity of 50 km/s.

The emission lines in the spectrum are strong, but absorption lines from the Be star are weak and so the exact spectral type is difficult to determine. Overall the spectral class is similar to the other blue giant, but the relative weakness of some luminosity-dependent lines suggest that it could be a main sequence star. It appears to be slightly hotter and slightly less luminous than the other giant star, but the exact properties are difficult to determine due to its rapid rotation, the weak absorption lines, and the presence of strong emission lines from the disk.

== See also ==
- Stellar vampirism
- LB-1, another binary system with a Be star and a stripped helium star previously thought to contain a black hole.
