= Gaia BH2 =

Binary system in Centaurus

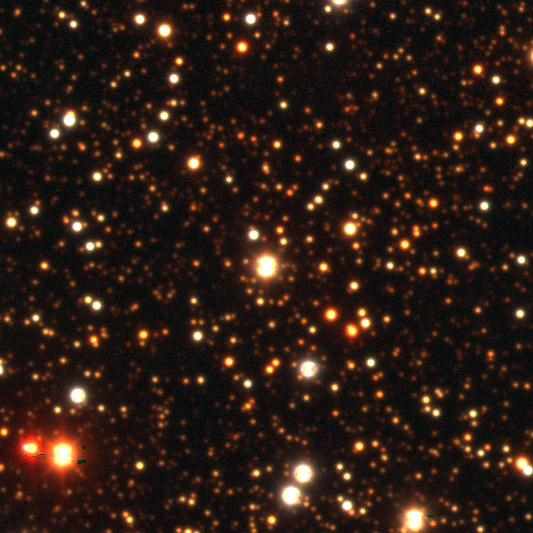
- DECaPS image of Gaia BH2 (star at the center)

Observation data Epoch J2000 Equinox ICRS
- Constellation: Centaurus
- Right ascension: 13^{h} 50^{m} 16.748^{s}
- Declination: −59° 14′ 20.33″
- Apparent magnitude (V): 12.711

Characteristics

Red giant
- Evolutionary stage: Red giant branch

Black hole
- Evolutionary stage: Stellar black hole

Astrometry
Radial velocity (R_{v})	−5.04±2.08 km/s
Proper motion (μ)	RA: −10.48±0.1 mas/yr Dec.: −4.61±0.06 mas/yr
Parallax (π)	0.859±0.018 mas
Distance	3,800 ± 80 ly (1,160 ± 20 pc)

Orbit
Period (P)	1,276.7±0.6 d
Semi-major axis (a)	4.96±0.08 AU
Eccentricity (e)	0.5176±0.0009
Inclination (i)	34.87±0.34°
Longitude of the node (Ω)	266.9±0.5°
Periastron epoch (T)	2457438.3±1.4
Argument of periastron (ω) (secondary)	130.9±0.4°
Semi-amplitude (K_{1}) (primary)	25.23±0.04 km/s

Details

Red giant
Mass	1.17±0.08 M_{☉}
Radius	8.55+0.20 −0.15 R_{☉}
Luminosity (bolometric)	24.6±1.6 L_{☉}
Surface gravity (log g)	2.71±0.24 cgs
Temperature	4,604±87 K
Metallicity [Fe/H]	−0.22±0.02 dex
Rotation	398±5 days (preliminary estimate)
Rotational velocity (v sin i)	<1.5 km/s
Age	5.1+1.2 −1.8 Gyr

Black hole
Mass	8.94±0.34 M_{☉}

Other designations
- Gaia BH2, UCAC4 154-126202, 2MASS J13501675-5914203, Gaia DR3 5870569352746779008

Database references
SIMBAD	data

Gaia BH2 (Gaia DR3 5870569352746779008) is a binary system consisting of a red giant and a stellar-mass black hole. Gaia BH2 is located about 3,800 light years away (1.16 kpc away) in the constellation of Centaurus, making it as of 2024 the third-closest known black hole system to Earth. Gaia BH2 is the second black hole discovered from Gaia DR3 astrometric data.

The black hole and red giant orbit the system barycentre every 1,277 days, or around 3.5 years, with a moderate eccentricity of 0.518. The black hole's mass is around 8.94 M_{☉}, which means its Schwarzschild radius should be about 26.4 km (16.4 mi). The red giant has a mass of 1.17 M_{☉} and a radius of 8.6 R_{☉}. Its temperature is estimated at 4,604 K (4,331 °C; 7,828 °F). The star is enriched in alpha elements, and thus is believed to have undergone mass transfer with another star.

== Discovery ==
Gaia BH2 was originally discovered as a black hole binary candidate in 2022, found via astrometric observations with Gaia, along with Gaia BH1. At that time it was not clear if Gaia BH2 did definitely harbour a black hole, but it was the only plausible candidate in the Gaia data other than Gaia BH1. Later radial velocity observations confirmed this black hole system and refined its orbital parameters.

== See also ==
- List of nearest known black holes
- Gaia BH1
- Gaia BH3
