= Swift J1727.8−1613 =

Ultraluminous x-ray binary

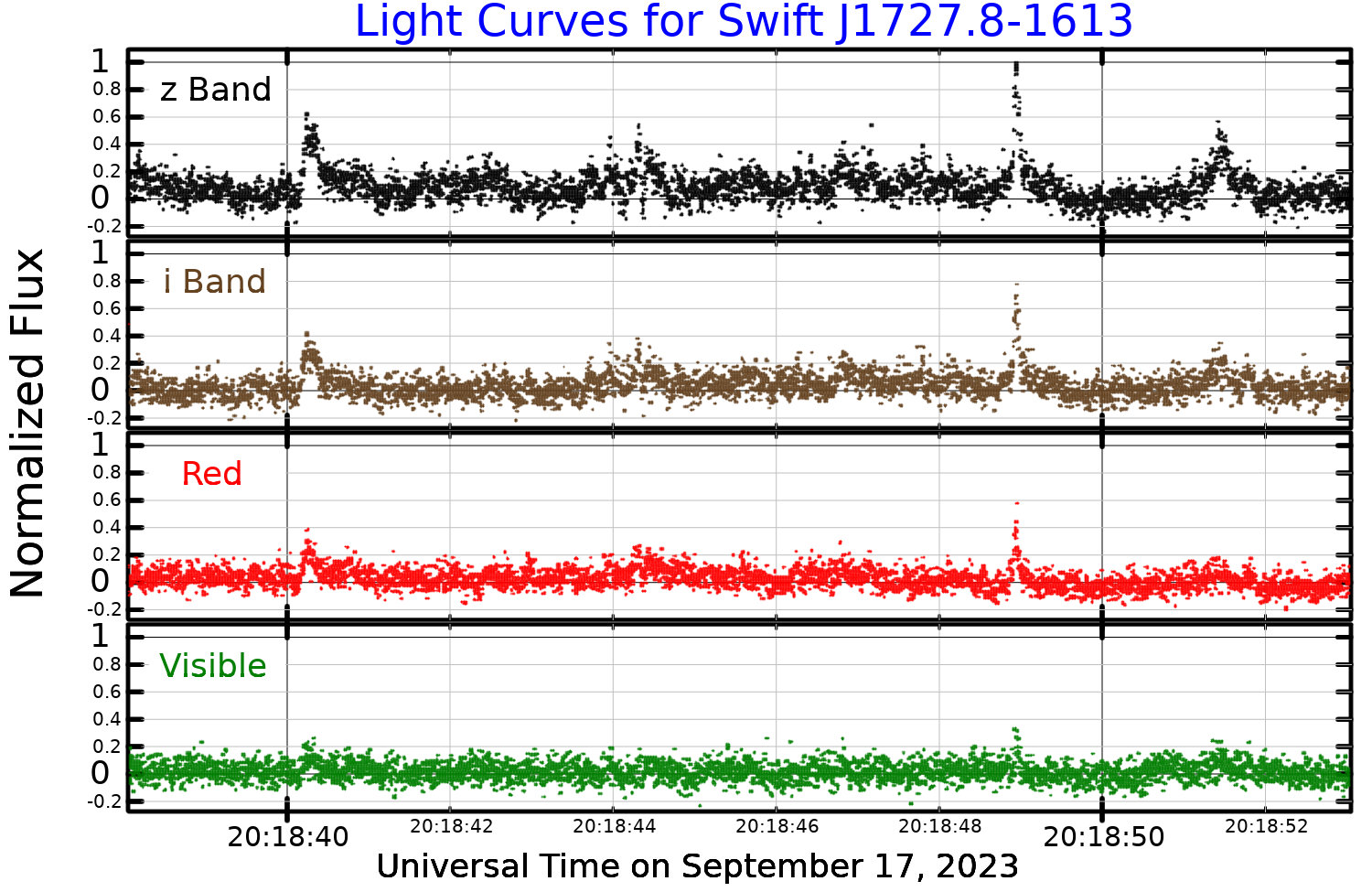
- Light curves for Swift J1727.8−1613 in four photometric bands, showing several flares. Credit: Adapted from Vincentelli et al. (2025)
- Swift J1727.8-1613
- Right ascension: 17^{h} 27^{m} 43.3135483931^{s}
- Declination: −16° 12′ 19.062182343″
- Apparent magnitude (V): 12.7

Characteristics

Compact object
- Evolutionary stage: Black hole

Donor star
- Evolutionary stage: Main-sequence star
- Spectral type: K4V

Astrometry
Distance	8800 ly (2698 pc)

Orbit
Period (P)	7.6 hours
Inclination (i)	30-60°

Details

Black hole
Mass	>3.12±0.10 M_{☉}

Swift J1727.8-1613 (also known as J1727) is a ultraluminous low-mass x-ray binary 8,800 light years (2,698 parsecs) away with an orbital period of about 7.6 hours. The compact object in the system is a stellar-mass black hole with a mass of at least 3.12±0.10 M_{☉︎}, in orbit with an early K-type companion star. The black hole's relativistic jet is the most resolved continuous X-ray binary jet, and one of the most physically extended X-ray binary jets yet discovered. The system was first detected in August 2023.

== System properties ==
The system reached a peak optical magnitude of approximately 12.7, making it an interest of research into black hole x-ray binaries. In x-ray wavelengths, J1727 transitions between soft and hard x-ray states. In the soft state, the X-ray emission has a spectrum suggesting a geometrically thin, optically thick accretion disk. The accretion disk is believed to extend down to the innermost stable circular orbit of the black hole.

== Relativistic jets ==
In August 2023, a bright outburst from the binary system was detected that would last for another 10 months. This observation was suggestive of a jet oriented in the north–south direction in the hard x-ray state. The jet is believed to extend for 95-160 astronomical units.
