= Stellar vampirism =

Astronomical phenomenon

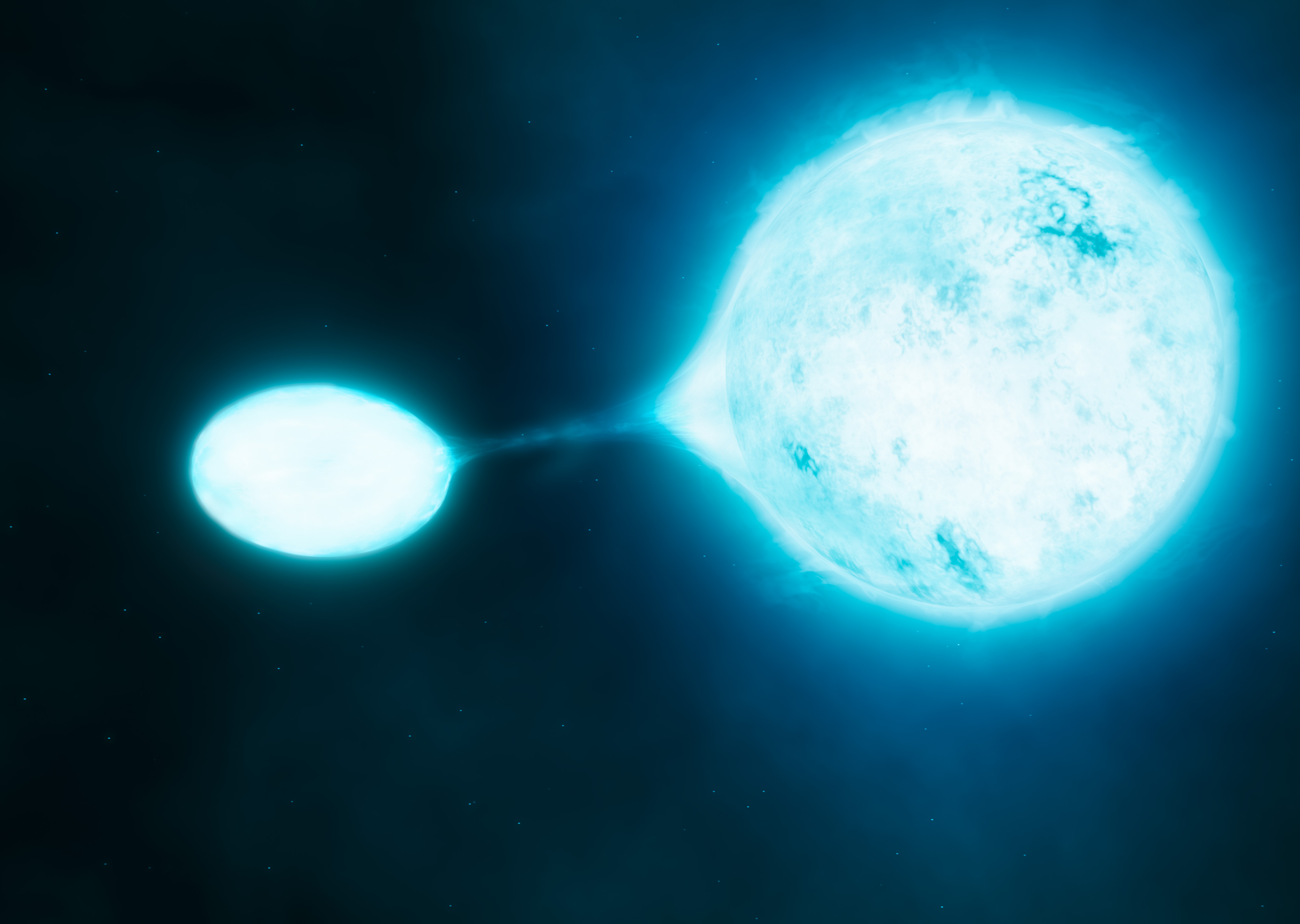
Artist's impression of a vampire star and its victim

A phenomenon often referred to as "stellar vampirism". This animation shows what the system might look like; it's composed of an oblate star with a disc around it (a Be "vampire" star; foreground) and B-type star that has been stripped of its atmosphere (background).

Stellar vampirism is an astronomical phenomenon in which a star (usually O-type), known as a "vampire star," in a binary system attracts the mass of another. As stars age in binary systems, they can grow past the threshold at which their gravity protects them from their companion. The process of stellar vampirism results in the "vampire star" having an extended life. The "victim" star is left with its core exposed, which mimics the appearance of a much younger star. An example of a star system exhibiting stellar vampirism is HR 6819.

== See also ==
- Interacting binary star
