= Gaia18ajz =

Possible black hole in constellation Scutum

- Object type: Black hole
- Other designations: AT2018uh

Observation data (Epoch J2000)
- Constellation: Scutum
- Right ascension: 277.56025 -8.22021
- Declination: 18:30:14.46 -08:13:12.76
- Distance: 1.14-1.31 kpc
- Apparent magnitude: 14.23 ±0.05, 12.81 ±0.1, 12.31 ±0.04, 17.52 ±0.16
- Mass: 4.9-11.1 solar masses

Gaia18ajz is a candidate black hole that was discovered through a microlensing event. Its mass and distance is not exactly known but it can either be located 1.14 kiloparsecs from earth with a mass of 4.9 solar masses or located at a distance of 1.31 kiloparsecs from earth with a mass of 11.1 solar masses.

It was discovered in 2018 by the Gaia Science Alerts system through gravitational microlensing.
