= NGC 3201 =

Globular cluster in the constellation Vela

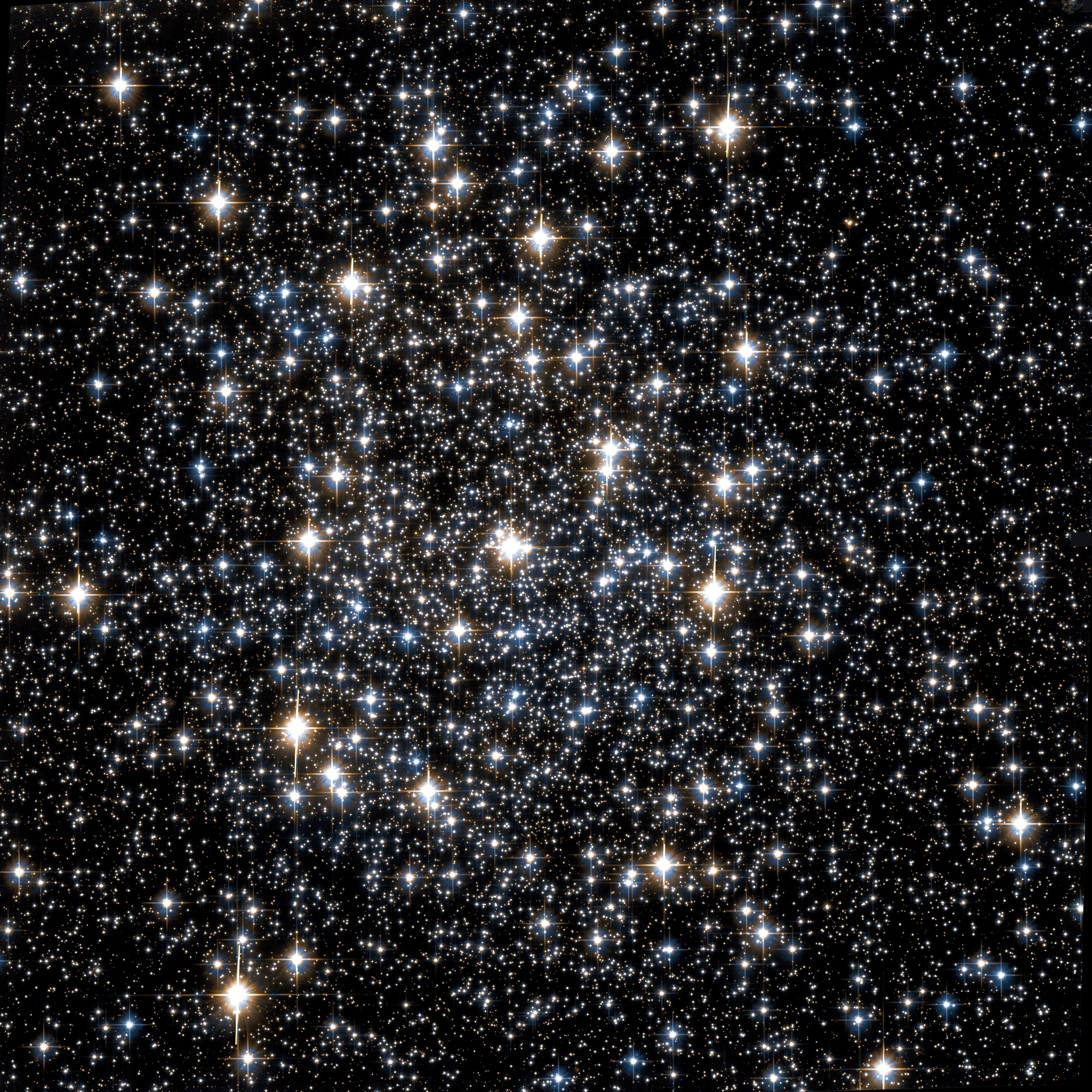
- NGC 3201 by Hubble Space Telescope; 3.5′ view

Observation data (J2000 epoch)
- Class: X
- Constellation: Vela
- Right ascension: 10^{h} 17^{m} 36.82^{s}
- Declination: –46° 24′ 44.9″
- Distance: 4.55 kpc (14.8 kly)
- Apparent magnitude (V): +6.9
- Apparent dimensions (V): 20′

Physical characteristics
- Mass: 1.57×10^{5} M_{☉}
- Radius: 40 ly
- V_{HB}: 14.77
- Metallicity: [Fe/H] = –1.24 dex
- Estimated age: 12.2±0.5 Gyr
- Other designations: GCl 15, GC 2068, h 3238, Dun 445, Bennett 44, Caldwell 79, Melotte 99

NGC 3201 (also known as Caldwell 79) is a low galactic latitude globular cluster in the southern constellation of Vela. It has a very low central concentration of stars. This cluster was discovered by James Dunlop on May 28, 1826 and listed in his 1827 catalogue. He described it as "a pretty large pretty bright round nebula, 4′ or 5′ diameter, very gradually condensed towards the centre, easily resolved into stars; the figure is rather irregular, and the stars are considerably scattered on the south".

The radial velocity of this cluster is unusually high at 490 km/s, larger than any other cluster known. This corresponds to a peculiar velocity of 240 km/s. While high, this is lower than the escape velocity of the Milky Way galaxy. It is located at a distance of 16,300 light years from the Sun and has an estimated mass of 157,000 times the mass of the Sun. This cluster is about 10.24 billion years old.

The stellar population of this cluster is inhomogeneous, varying with distance from the core. The effective temperature of the stars shows an increase with greater distance, with the redder and cooler stars tending to be located closer to the core. As of 2010, this is one of only two clusters (including Messier 4) that shows a definite inhomogeneous population.

== Black holes ==
Because NGC 3201 is a less dense globular cluster, far from undergoing core collapse, it is believed to harbor a substantial black hole population in its core. Indeed, a few black holes have been detected in this cluster, orbiting nearby stars. In a study from 2022, the movement of stars near the cluster's core derived from data gathered by the Hubble Space Telescope and the European Space Agency's Gaia spacecraft indicated that NGC 3201 has a sub-cluster of stellar mass black holes, with a total mass of roughly a thousand solar masses. The same study showed, with dynamical simulations, that this sub-cluster could contain nearly a hundred black holes.

== Gallery ==
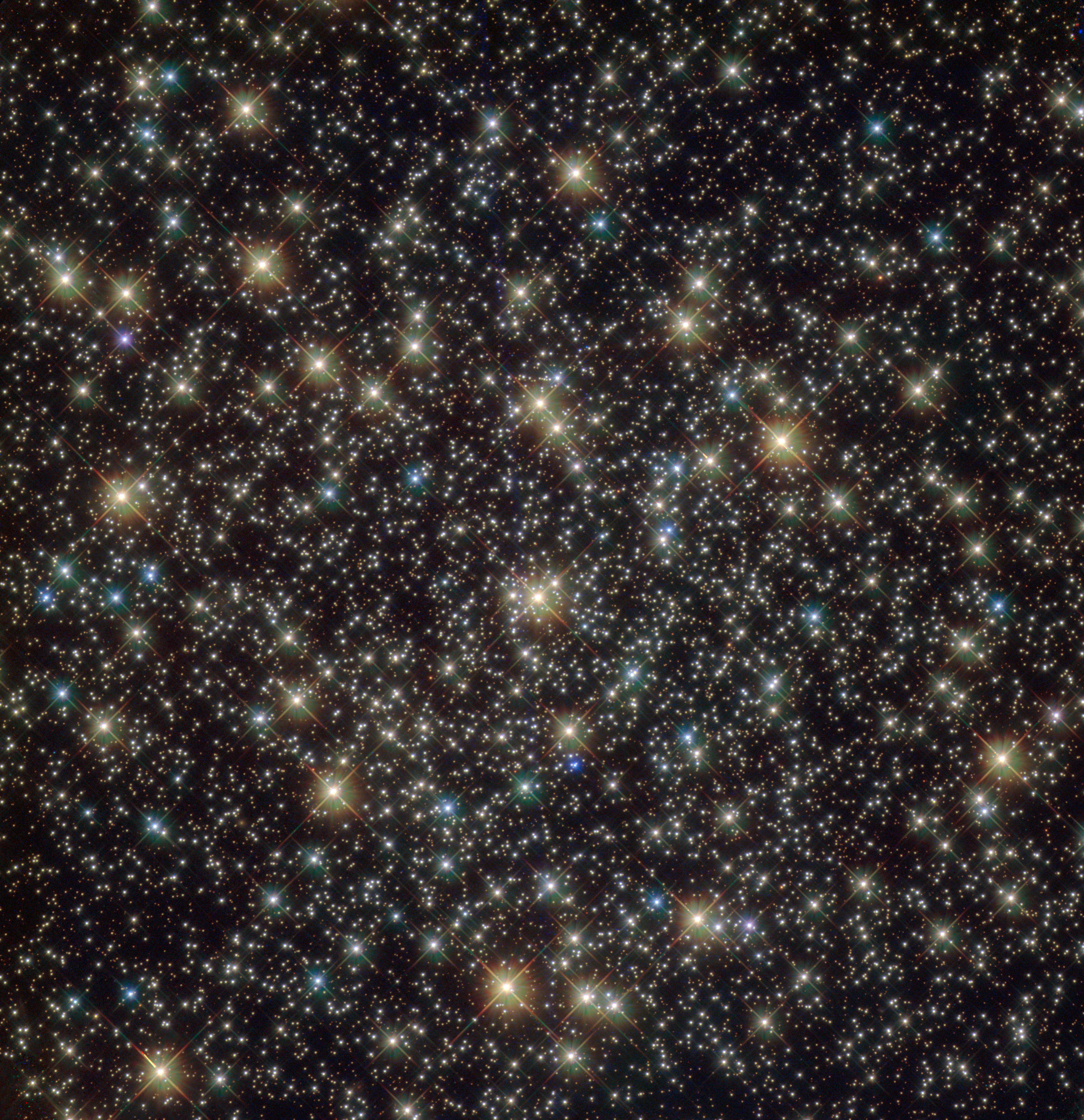
Astronomers discovered a black hole at the heart of NGC 3201.

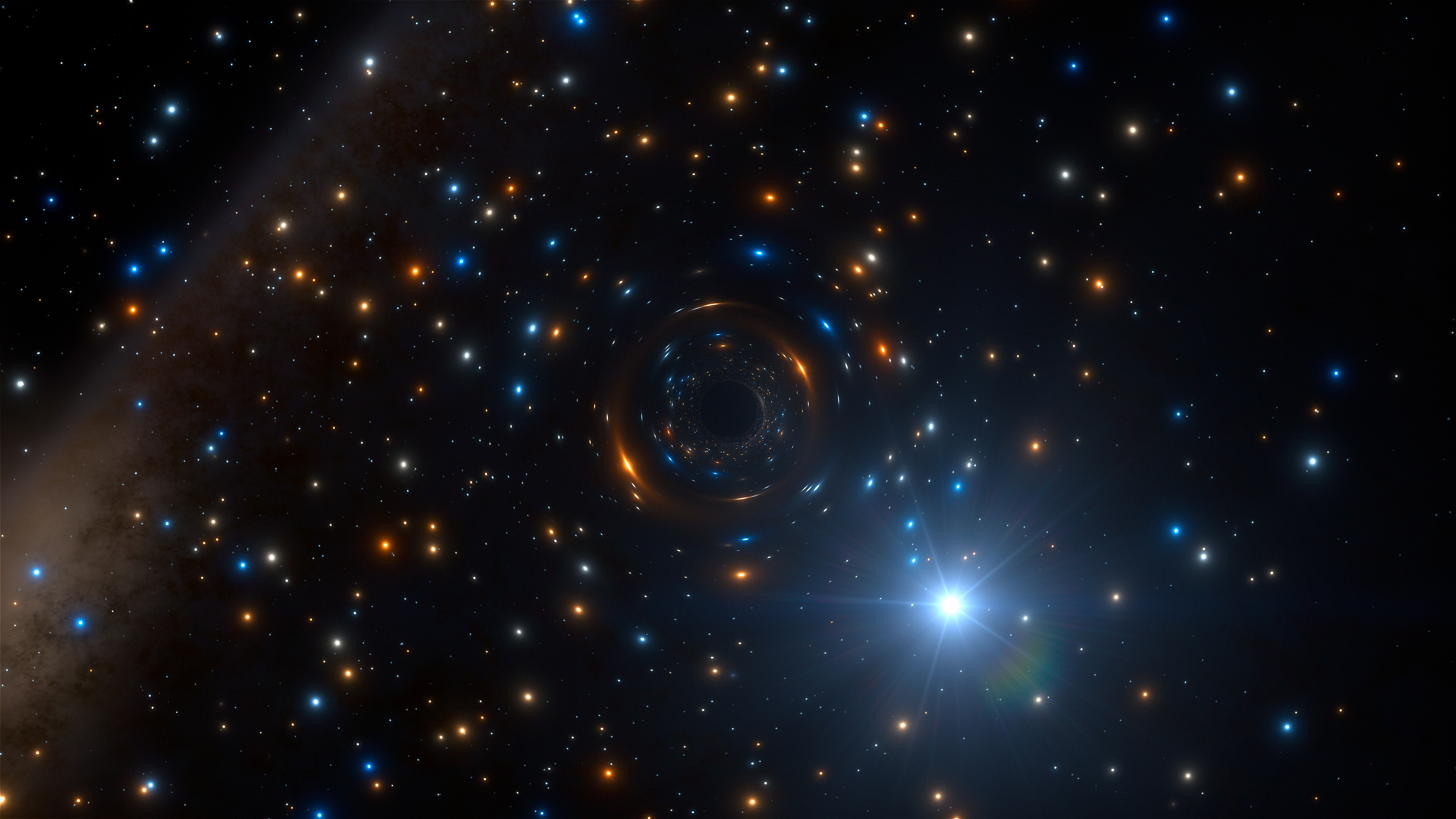
Artist's impression of the black hole binary system in NGC 3201.

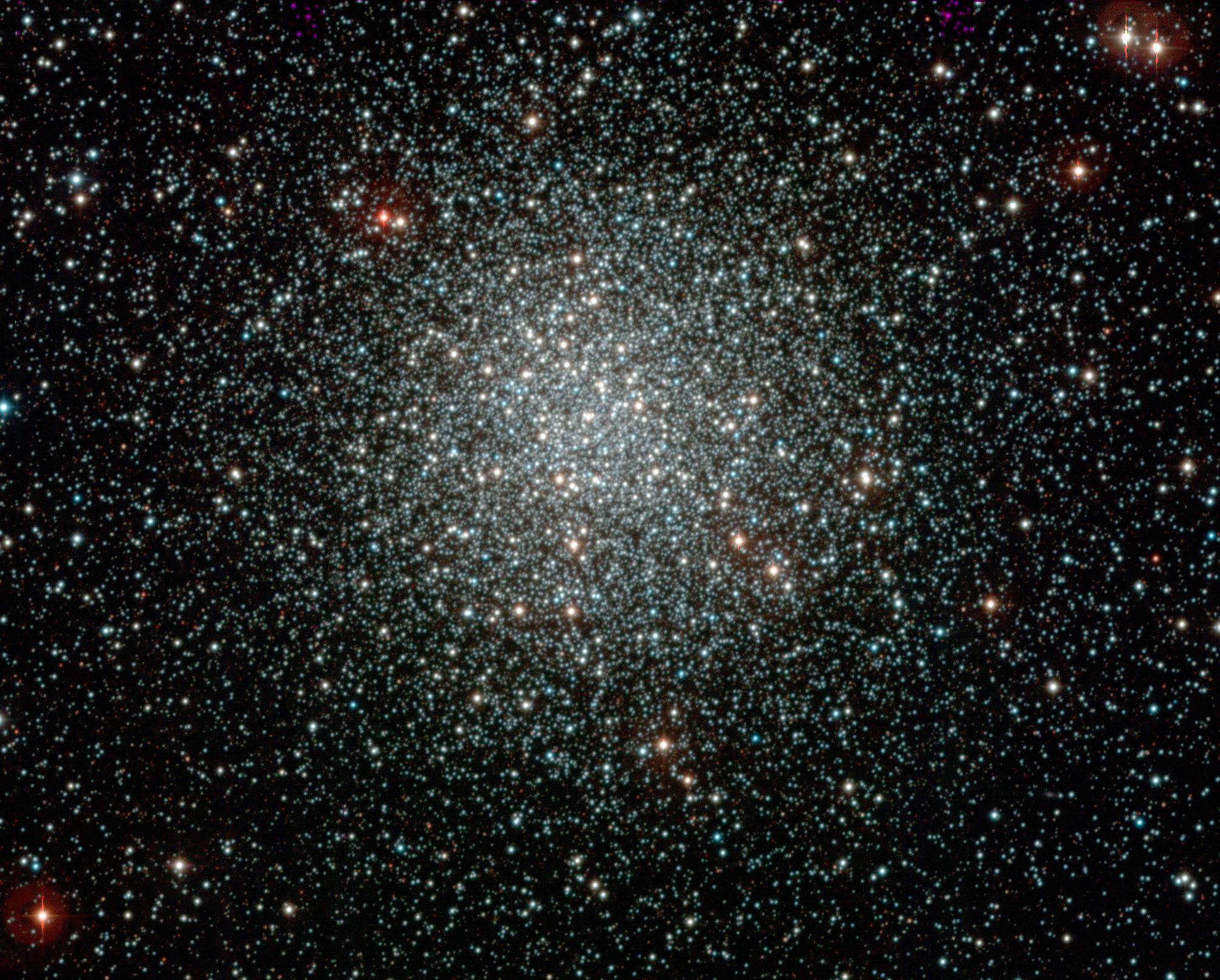
Colour-composite image of NGC 3201, obtained with the WFI instrument on the ESO/MPG 2.2-m telescope at La Silla Observatory

== See also ==
- List of nearest black holes
