= Gaia BH3 =

Binary system in Aquila

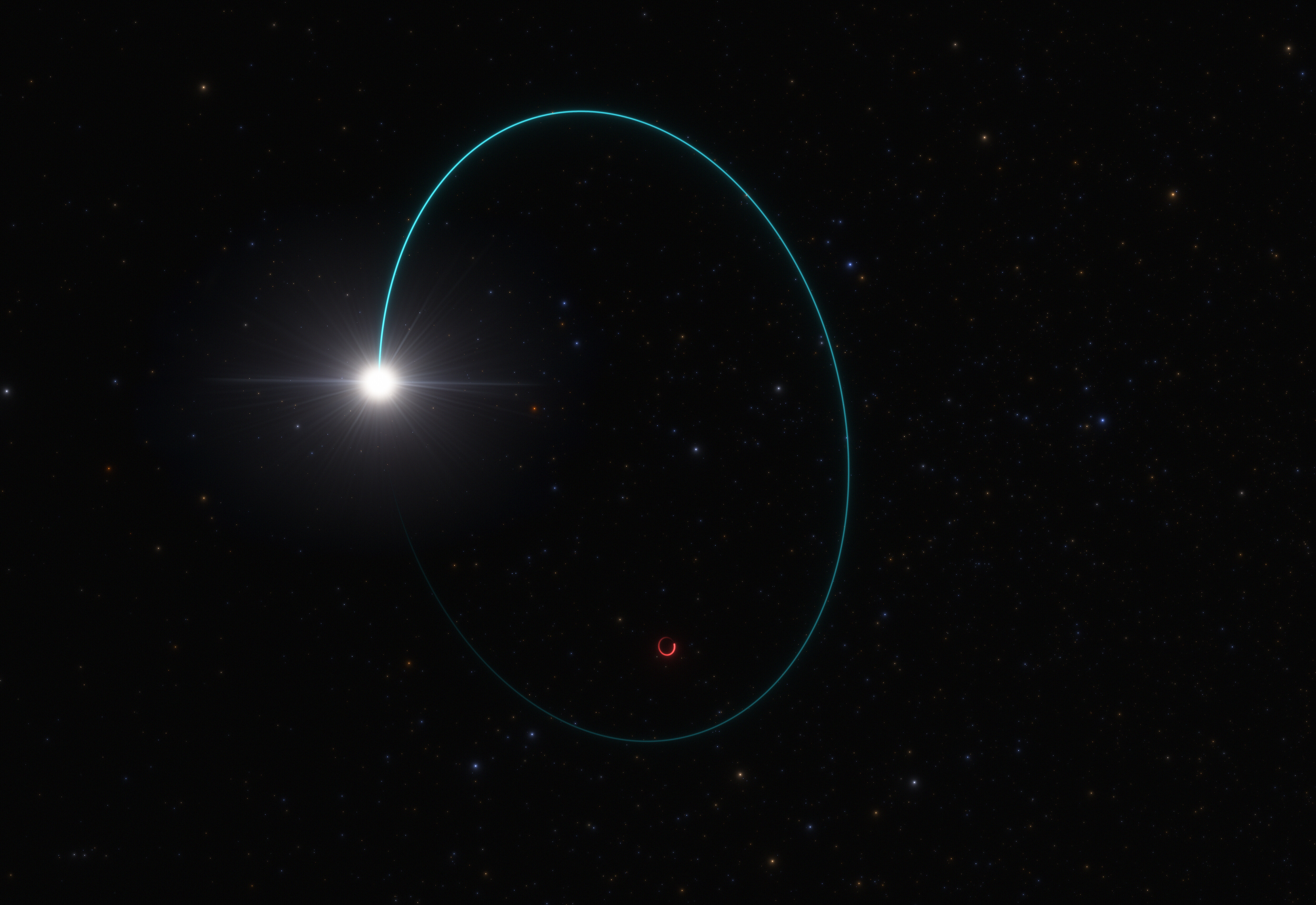
- Artist’s impression of Gaia BH3; Credit: ESO/L. Calçada

Observation data Epoch J2000 Equinox ICRS
- Constellation: Aquila
- Right ascension: 19^{h} 39^{m} 18.71^{s}
- Declination: +14° 55′ 54.0″

Characteristics

Star
- Evolutionary stage: red giant branch
- Spectral type: G

Black hole
- Evolutionary stage: Stellar black hole

Astrometry
Radial velocity (R_{v})	−333.2±3.4 km/s
Proper motion (μ)	RA: −28.34±0.06 mas/yr Dec.: −155.19±0.10 mas/yr
Parallax (π)	1.6844±0.0080 mas
Distance	1,936 ± 9 ly (594 ± 3 pc)

Orbit
Period (P)	11.57 ± 0.25 years
Semi-major axis (a)	16.55±0.26 AU
Eccentricity (e)	0.7280+0.0044 −0.0043
Inclination (i)	110.601+0.094 −0.093°
Longitude of the node (Ω)	136.21+0.13 −0.12°
Periastron epoch (T)	2458177.00+0.92 −0.94 JD
Argument of periastron (ω) (secondary)	77.79±0.16°
Semi-amplitude (K_{1}) (primary)	Star: 56.85±0.30 km/s

Details

Star
Mass	0.76±0.05 M_{☉}
Radius	4.936±0.016 R_{☉}
Surface gravity (log g)	2.929±0.003 cgs
Temperature	5,212±80 K
Metallicity [Fe/H]	−2.56±0.11 dex
Age	13 Gyr

Black hole
Mass	33.08+0.48 −0.47 M_{☉}

Other designations
- Gaia BH3, 2MASS J19391872+1455542, Gaia DR3 4318465066420528000, LS II +14 13

Database references
SIMBAD	data

Gaia BH3 (Gaia DR3 4318465066420528000) is a binary system consisting of a metal-poor giant star with spectral type G and a stellar-mass black hole. Gaia BH3 is located 1926 light years away (590.6±5.8 pc away) in the constellation of Aquila. Gaia BH3 is the first black hole discovered from preliminary Gaia DR4 astrometric data.

The black hole and star orbit the system barycentre every 11.6 years, with an orbital distance ranging from 4.5–29 AU. The black hole's mass is 32.70 M_{☉}, the most massive known stellar black hole in the Milky Way.

The black hole Gaia BH3 is the second known stellar black hole more massive than about 10 M_{☉} (with the first being Cygnus X-1). The mass of Gaia BH3 is quite similar to the mass of merging binary black holes found via gravitational waves. These massive black holes were suspected to be formed by metal-poor stars and the fact that Gaia BH3 has a metal-poor companion strengthens this conclusion.

Gaia BH3 was found to be part of a disrupted star cluster of low mass and this star cluster is today a halo stellar stream, called ED-2. This stellar stream is very old, with an age comparable to the globular cluster Messier 92. This means that Gaia BH3 likely formed more than 13 billion years ago and the black hole might have formed via direct collapse of a massive star. Alternatively the black hole could have formed via binary interaction inside the star cluster. The ED-2 star cluster has a mass between 2,000 M_{☉} and 42,000 M_{☉}.

== Discovery ==
Gaia BH3 was identified in astrometric observations with Gaia, during an analysis in preparation for Data Release 4. It was announced with the publication of a scientific paper in the journal Astronomy & Astrophysics on 16 April 2024.

== See also ==
- List of nearest known black holes
- Gaia BH1
- Gaia BH2
