= MACHO-96-BLG-5 =

Stellar mass black hole

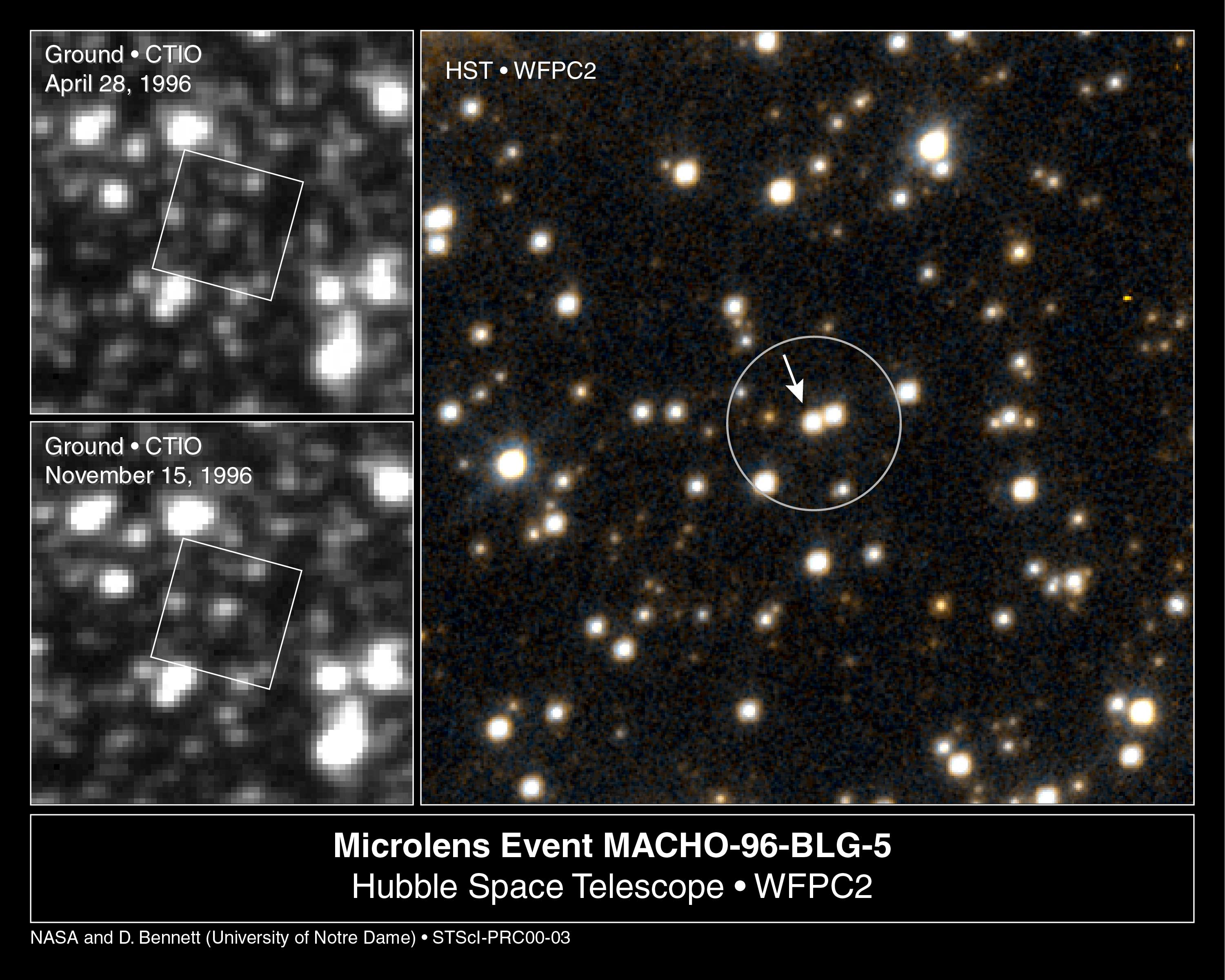
- Image of MACHO-96-BLG-5
- Object type: Black hole

Observation data (Epoch J2000)
- Constellation: Sagittarius
- Right ascension: 18h 05m 023s
- Declination: −27° 42′ 17″
- Distance: 0.5-2 kpc
- Mass: 6 solar masses

MACHO-96-BLG-5 (M96-95) is a stellar mass black hole that was discovered through gravitational microlensing. It is located at a distance of 0.5-2 kiloparsecs from Earth towards the bulge of the Milky Way galaxy. It has an estimated mass of 6 solar masses.
