= Rogue black hole =

Interstellar or intergalactic object

Animated astrometric observations of the gravitational microlensing of the interstellar MOA-2011-BLG-191/OGLE-2011-BLG-0462

A rogue black hole is a black hole that is not bound by any object's gravity, allowing it to float freely throughout the universe. Since black holes emit no light, the only ways to detect them are gravitational lensing or x-ray bursts that occur when they destroy an object.

== Intergalactic rogue black holes ==
These are objects without a host galactic group, caused by collisions between two galaxies or when the merging of two black holes is disrupted. It has been estimated that there could be 12 rogue supermassive black holes on the edge of the Milky Way galaxy.

== Interstellar rogue black holes ==
=== Examples ===
In January 2022, a team of astronomers reported the first unambiguous detection and mass measurement of an isolated stellar black hole, using the Hubble Space Telescope together with the Microlensing Observations in Astrophysics (MOA) and the Optical Gravitational Lensing Experiment (OGLE). This black hole, OGLE-2011-BLG-0462/MOA-2011-BLG-191, is located 5,000 light-years away, has a mass 7.1 times that of the Sun, and moves at about 45 km/s. While there have been other candidates, they have been detected more indirectly.

== See also ==
- Rogue star
- Rogue planet
- Rogue extragalactic planets
- Rogue comet
- Tidally detached exomoon
- Primordial black hole
