= OGLE-2011-BLG-0462 =

Black hole in the constellation Sagittarius

- Animated astrometric observations of the gravitational microlensing of OGLE-2011-BLG-0462/MOA-2011-BLG-191

Observation data Epoch 2455874.50236 (2011-11-09.00 UT) Equinox ICRS
- Constellation: Sagittarius
- Right ascension: 17^{h} 51^{m} 40.15^{s}
- Declination: −29° 53′ 26.2″

Astrometry
Radial velocity (R_{v})	134.0 km/s
Proper motion (μ)	RA: −2.210 mas/yr Dec.: −3.533 mas/yr
Distance	5,000±490 ly (1,520±150 pc)

Details
Mass	7.15±0.83 M_{☉}
Radius	21.1±2.5 km

Other designations
- MOA-2011-BLG-191

Database references
SIMBAD	data

OGLE-2011-BLG-0462, also known as MOA-2011-BLG-191, is a stellar-mass black hole isolated in interstellar space. OGLE-2011-BLG-0462 lies at a distance of 1,720 parsecs (5,610 light years) in the direction of the galactic bulge in the constellation Sagittarius. The black hole has a mass of about 7.15 M_{☉}. OGLE-2011-BLG-0462 is the first truly isolated black hole which has been confirmed.

== Discovery ==
OGLE-2011-BLG-0462 was discovered by the OGLE survey through microlensing when it passed in front of a background star that was 20,000 light years away from Earth. The black hole's gravity bent the star's light, causing a sharp spike in brightness that was detected by the Hubble Space Telescope. It took six years to confirm the existence of OGLE-2011-BLG-0462. Its initial kick velocity has been estimated to have an upper limit of 100 km/s. No significant X-ray emission has been detected from gas accreting onto the black hole indicating that it is truly isolated.
