= List of open letters by academics =

This article lists notable open letters that were initiated by scientists or other academics or have a substantial share of academic signees.

Open letters that are not open for signing by other academics or the public in general and have not received both a large number of signatures – in specific no less than 10 before 2000 and no less than 40 after 2010 – and substantial media attention are not included, nor are petitions. With the advent of the Internet and World Wide Web, such open letters may have become far more frequent.

Open letters targeting or defending individual academics or small groups of scholars as well as letters calling for retractions of specific studies are not included.

Name	Year	Signatures	Scope / topic	Demands	Organized by	Demand achieved	Criticized
Elsevier: NeuroImage transition - all editors have resigned over the high publication fee, and are starting a new non-profit journal, Imaging Neuroscience	2023	42 academics	Global	All editors at NeuroImage and NeuroImage: Reports resigned because they oppose the large fee ($3450) that the journal owner, publishing giant Elsevier, charges authors to make their scientific papers open access (OA). As Elsevier refused to reduce the fee, they launch a new OA journal Imaging Neuroscience hosted by the non-profit publisher MIT Press. They commit to make the new journal replace their abandoned one as "the top journal in [their] field" and hope they demonstrate "the way forward in non-profit publishing".	(Group action of full editors-team)	DA	No
Pause Giant AI Experiments: An Open Letter	2023	>1,000 incl. prominent figures in software & tech and risk researchers	Global	"AI labs to immediately pause for at least 6 months the training of AI systems more powerful than GPT-4" due to "profound risks to society and humanity".	Future of Life Institute		Yes
Open Letter to the European Commission on the Cyber Resilience Act	2023	Many open source software organizations incl. OSI and TDF	European Union / Global	Changes to the proposed Cyber Resilience Act due to "unnecessary economic and technological risk to the EU" and improving engagement with the under-represented open source software community as "more than 70% of the software in Europe [open source/FOSS] is about to be regulated without an in-depth consultation" and potential chilling effects of OSS development.	The Eclipse Foundation		
An open letter regarding research on reflecting sunlight to reduce the risks of climate change	2023	>110 academics	Global	Acceleration of research on "atmospheric aerosols and their potential to increase the reflection of sunlight from the atmosphere to address climate risk".			Yes
Open Letter calling for an International Non-Use Agreement on Solar Geoengineering	2022	>380 academics	Global	"[I]mmediate political action from governments, the United Nations, and other actors to prevent the normalization of solar geoengineering as a climate policy option".	16 scholars	No	Yes
Fossil Free Research Open Letter	2022	>800 incl. Nobel laureates & IPCC authors	Global	Universities should stop accepting funding from fossil fuel companies to conduct climate research.	Fossil Free Research	No	
2022 open letter from Nobel laureates in support of Ukraine	2022	>200 Nobel laureates	Russia, Ukraine	Independence of the Ukrainian people and freedom of the Ukrainian state (in face of the 2022 Russian invasion of the country).	Roald Hoffmann, Richard J. Roberts	No	
An open letter of Russian scientists and science journalists against the war in Ukraine	2022	>8,000 academics and science journalists of Russia	Russia, Ukraine	Condemnation of the war against Ukraine with "responsibility for unleashing a new war in Europe [lying] entirely with Russia".		NA	
Montreal Declaration on Animal Exploitation	2022	>500 academics (moral and political philosophy)	Global	"Insofar as it involves unnecessary violence and harm, [they] declare that animal exploitation is unjust and morally indefensible".		NA	Yes
Fulfil the NPT: From nuclear threats to human security	2022	>1,000 incl. many academics	Global	Four steps towards a nuclear-weapon-free world to take by the Tenth Review Conference of the Non-Proliferation Treaty in 2022.	NoFirstUse Global		
Statement by other Academics in support of Bill No. 28 of 2022	2022	>100 academics	Malta	Passage of abortion law changes Bill No. 28 of 2022 as is.			
Scientists & Experts Want Climate Action – An Open Letter to the White House	2021	>1,500 academics incl. 5 senior/lead IPCC authors	USA / Global	"President Joe Biden and his administration to commit to reducing U.S. heat-trapping emissions by at least 50 percent below 2005 levels by 2030".	Union of Concerned Scientists		
It is essential to Remove Climate-Harming Logging and Fossil Fuel Provisions from Reconciliation and Infrastructure Bills	2021	>100 academics	USA / Global	Removal of logging and fossil fuel provisions from reconciliation and infrastructure bills by President Biden and members of Congress.			
Scientists and Engineers Letter to President Biden on the Nuclear Posture Review	2021	~700 scientists and engineers incl. 21 Nobel laureates	USA / Global	President Biden to "use his forthcoming declaration of a new national strategy for managing nuclear weapons as a chance to cut the U.S. arsenal by a third, and to declare, for the first time, that the United States would never be the first to use nuclear weapons in a conflict".			
An Open Letter from U.S. Scientists Imploring President Biden to End the Fossil Fuel Era	2021	>330 academics	USA / Global	"Completely stop federally authorized fossil fuel expansion; Declare a climate emergency; Abandon industry delay tactics"	Biologist Dr. Sandra Steingraber, climate scientist Dr. Peter Kalmus, advocacy groups Center for Biological Diversity and Food & Water Watch		
Stop attempts to criminalise nonviolent climate protest	2021	>400 academics	Global	End of the criminalization of non-violent civil disobedience from direct action climate activist groups.	Oscar Berglund, others		
Academic Open Letter in Support of the TRIPS Intellectual Property Waiver Proposal	2021	>100 academics (international intellectual property)	Global	A "temporary TRIPS waiver – as proposed by India and South Africa and supported by more than 100 countries – [as a] necessary and proportionate legal measure towards the clearing of existing intellectual property barriers to scaling up of production of COVID-19 health technologies in a direct, consistent and effective fashion".		No	
WTO must ban harmful fisheries subsidies	2021	296 academics	Global	WTO to eliminate increasing harmful fisheries subsidies.			
It Is Time to Address Airborne Transmission of Coronavirus Disease 2019 (COVID-19)	2020	>239 academics	Global	WHO, medical community and relevant national and other international bodies to "recognize the potential for airborne spread" of COVID-19 by around the time of the letter.	Lidia Morawska, Donald K Milton	No	
Call to stop "Chain of Killings"	2020	>100 academics	Philippine	End to President Rodrigo Duterte's "bloody war on drugs" and the creation of a Truth Commission.		No	
A Letter on Justice and Open Debate	2020	153; mostly scholars and writers	Global	Condemnation of cancel culture and liberal intolerance and defending free speech, making an argument that hostility to free speech was becoming widespread on what could be described as "the political left" as well.	Thomas Chatterton Williams, Robert Worth, George Packer, David Greenberg, Mark Lilla	NA	Yes
A warning on climate and the risk of societal collapse	2020	258 mostly academics	Global	Engagement with the risk of disruption and even collapse of societies due to climate change by policymakers.	Gesa Weyhenmeyer, Will Steffen	NA	
We declare our support for Extinction Rebellion	2019	>250 academics at Australian universities	Global	Declaration of support for Extinction Rebellion and sufficient change of Australian government's inaction on the climate crisis. It is based on a 2018 open letter.		NA	
School climate strike children's brave stand has our support	2019	224 academics	Global	Declaration of support for School Strikes for Climate.		NA	
The EU needs a stability and wellbeing pact, not more growth	2018	238 academics	Global	"Plan[ning]" for a post-growth future in which human and ecological wellbeing is prioritised over GDP by the European Union and its member states.	Wellbeing Economy Alliance and others	NA	
An Open Letter from Scientists to President-Elect Trump on Climate Change	2016	>800 academics (Earth science and energy)	USA / Global	Six steps of immediate and sustained action to take by Donald Trump against human-caused climate change.		No	
Science and the Public Interest – An Open Letter to President-Elect Trump and the 115th Congress	2016	>2,000 academics	USA / Global	Sufficient funding of scientific research as well as "support[ing] and rely[ing] on science as a key input for crafting public policy" by the incoming administration.	Union of Concerned Scientists	No	
Open Letter to Google From 80 Internet Scholars: Release RTBF Compliance Data	2015	80 academics	Global – Google	More transparency of Google's right to be forgotten (RTBF) processes.			
Open Letter on Artificial Intelligence	2015	>150 incl. Stephen Hawking, Elon Musk, and many AI experts	Global	The letter highlights both the positive and negative effects of artificial intelligence. According to Bloomberg Business, Professor Max Tegmark of MIT circulated the letter in order to find common ground between signatories who consider super intelligent AI a significant existential risk, and signatories such as Professor Oren Etzioni, who believe the AI field was being "impugned" by a one-sided media focus on the alleged risks. The letter contends that: [...]	Future of Life Institute	NA	
An Open Letter From Internet Engineers to the U.S. Congress	2011	83 prominent Internet inventors and engineers	USA, Canada / Global	Stoppage of SOPA and PIPA Internet blacklist bills.	Electronic Frontier Foundation	Yes	No
Open letter from ten Members of the Russian Academy of Sciences to the President	2007	10 members of the Russian Academy of Sciences	Russia	The letter was intended to warn both the society and the government about the growing influence of the Russian Orthodox Church and its expansion into many fields of social life, particularly into the state education system, which is strictly prohibited under the Russian Constitution.		No	Yes
Open letter to Gorbachev	1990	30 academics incl. Nobel laureates	Russia	Preventing privatisation of land itself, instead of a Georgist system of common ownership and the collection of public revenue through land-value taxation.			

== See also ==
- Collective action
- Collective intelligence
- Scientific consensus
- Scientific controversy

Policy

- 2026 in the environment#Open policy proposals
- Timeline of computing 2020–present#Open policy proposals
- Policy § Induction of policies

In the media and public awareness

- Reality § Media
- Science communication
- Science journalism
- Solutions journalism

Similar documents

- Letter of three hundred, only made public retrospectively
- World Scientists' Warning to Humanity
