= Induced gamma emission =

Bombarding atomic nuclei to give off very short-wavelength light

In physics, induced gamma emission (IGE) refers to the process of fluorescent emission of gamma rays from excited nuclei, usually involving a specific nuclear isomer. It is analogous to conventional fluorescence, which is defined as the emission of a photon (unit of light) by an excited electron in an atom or molecule. In the case of IGE, nuclear isomers can store significant amounts of excitation energy for times long enough for them to serve as nuclear fluorescent materials. There are over 800 known nuclear isomers but almost all are too intrinsically radioactive to be considered for applications. As of 2006 there were two proposed nuclear isomers that appeared to be physically capable of IGE fluorescence in safe arrangements: tantalum-180m and hafnium-178m2.

== History ==
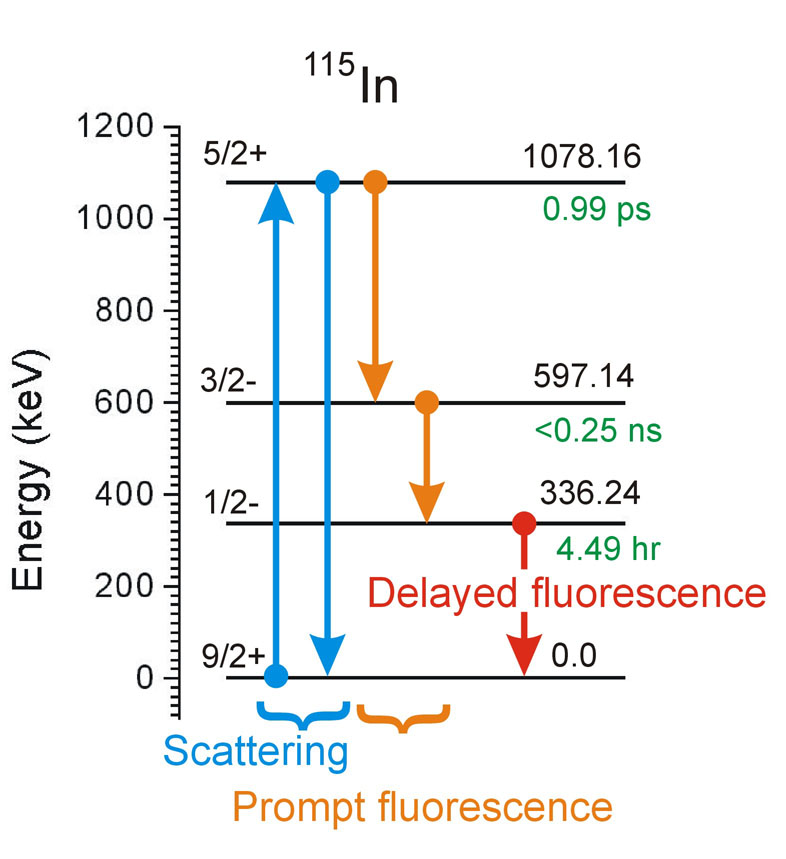
Energetics of IGE from ^{115}In. Arrows are photons, (up) absorption, (down) emission. Horizontal lines represent excited states of In involved in IGE.

Induced gamma emission is an example of interdisciplinary research bordering on both nuclear physics and quantum electronics. Viewed as a nuclear reaction it would belong to a class in which only photons were involved in creating and destroying states of nuclear excitation. It is a class usually overlooked in traditional discussions. In 1939 Bruno Pontecorvo and André Lazard reported the first example of this type of reaction. Indium was the target and in modern terminology describing nuclear reactions it would be written ^{115}In(γ,γ^{'})^{115m}In. The product nuclide carries an "m" to denote that it has a long enough half life (4.5 h in this case) to qualify as being a nuclear isomer. That is what made the experiment possible in 1939 because the researchers had hours to remove the products from the irradiating environment and then to study them in a more appropriate location.

With projectile photons, momentum and energy can be conserved only if the incident photon, X-ray or gamma, has precisely the energy corresponding to the difference in energy between the initial state of the target nucleus and some excited state that is not too different in terms of quantum properties such as spin. There is no threshold behavior and the incident projectile disappears and its energy is transferred into internal excitation of the target nucleus. It is a resonant process that is uncommon in nuclear reactions but normal in the excitation of fluorescence at the atomic level. Only as recently as 1988 was the resonant nature of this type of reaction finally proven. Such resonant reactions are more readily described by the formalities of atomic fluorescence and further development was facilitated by an interdisciplinary approach of IGE.

There is little conceptual difference in an IGE experiment when the target is a nuclear isomer. Such a reaction as ^{m}X(γ,γ^{'})X where ^{m}X is one of the five candidates listed above, is only different because there are lower energy states for the product nuclide to enter after the reaction than there were at the start. Practical difficulties arise from the need to ensure safety from the spontaneous radioactive decay of nuclear isomers in quantities sufficient for experimentation. Lifetimes must be long enough that doses from the spontaneous decay from the targets always remain within safe limits. In 1988 Collins and coworkers reported the first excitation of IGE from a nuclear isomer. They excited fluorescence from the nuclear isomer tantalum-180m with x-rays produced by an external beam radiotherapy linac. Results were surprising and considered to be controversial until the resonant states excited in the target were identified.

== Distinctive features ==
- If an incident photon is absorbed by an initial state of a target nucleus, that nucleus will be raised to a more energetic state of excitation. If that state can radiate its energy only during a transition back to the initial state, the result is a scattering process as seen in the schematic figure. That is not an example of IGE.
- If an incident photon is absorbed by an initial state of a target nucleus, that nucleus will be raised to a more energetic state of excitation. If there is a nonzero probability that sometimes that state will start a cascade of transitions as shown in the schematic, that state has been called a "gateway state" or "trigger level" or "intermediate state". One or more fluorescent photons are emitted, often with different delays after the initial absorption and the process is an example of IGE.
- If the initial state of the target nucleus is its ground (lowest energy) state, then the fluorescent photons will have less energy than that of the incident photon (as seen in the schematic figure). Since the scattering channel is usually the strongest, it can "blind" the instruments being used to detect the fluorescence and early experiments preferred to study IGE by pulsing the source of incident photons while detectors were gated off and then concentrating upon any delayed photons of fluorescence when the instruments could be safely turned back on.
- If the initial state of the target nucleus is a nuclear isomer (starting with more energy than the ground) it can also support IGE. However, in that case the schematic diagram is not simply the example seen for ^{115}In but read from right to left with the arrows turned the other way. Such a "reversal" would require simultaneous (to within <0.25 ns) absorption of two incident photons of different energies to get from the 4 h isomer back up to the "gateway state". Usually the study of IGE from a ground state to an isomer of the same nucleus teaches little about how the same isomer would perform if used as the initial state for IGE. In order to support IGE an energy for an incident photon would have to be found that would "match" the energy needed to reach some other gateway state not shown in the schematic that could launch its own cascade down to the ground state.
- If the target is a nuclear isomer storing a considerable amount of energy then IGE might produce a cascade that contains a transition that emits a photon with more energy than that of the incident photon. This would be the nuclear analog of upconversion in laser physics.
- If the target is a nuclear isomer storing a considerable amount of energy then IGE might produce a cascade through a pair of excited states whose lifetimes are "inverted" so that in a collection of such nuclei, population would build up in the longer lived upper level while emptying rapidly from the shorter lived lower member of the pair. The resulting inversion of population might support some form of coherent emission analogous to amplified spontaneous emission (ASE) in laser physics. If the physical dimensions of the collection of target isomer nuclei were long and thin, then a form of gamma-ray laser might result.

== Potential applications ==
=== Energy-specific dosimeters ===
Since the IGE from ground state nuclei requires the absorption of very specific photon energies to produce delayed fluorescent photons that are easily counted, there is the possibility to construct energy-specific dosimeters by combining several different nuclides. This was demonstrated for the calibration of the radiation spectrum from the DNA-PITHON pulsed nuclear simulator. Such a dosimeter could be useful in radiation therapy where X-ray beams may contain many energies. Since photons of different energies deposit their effects at different depths in the tissue being treated, it could help calibrate how much of the total dose would be deposited in the actual target volume.

=== Aircraft power ===
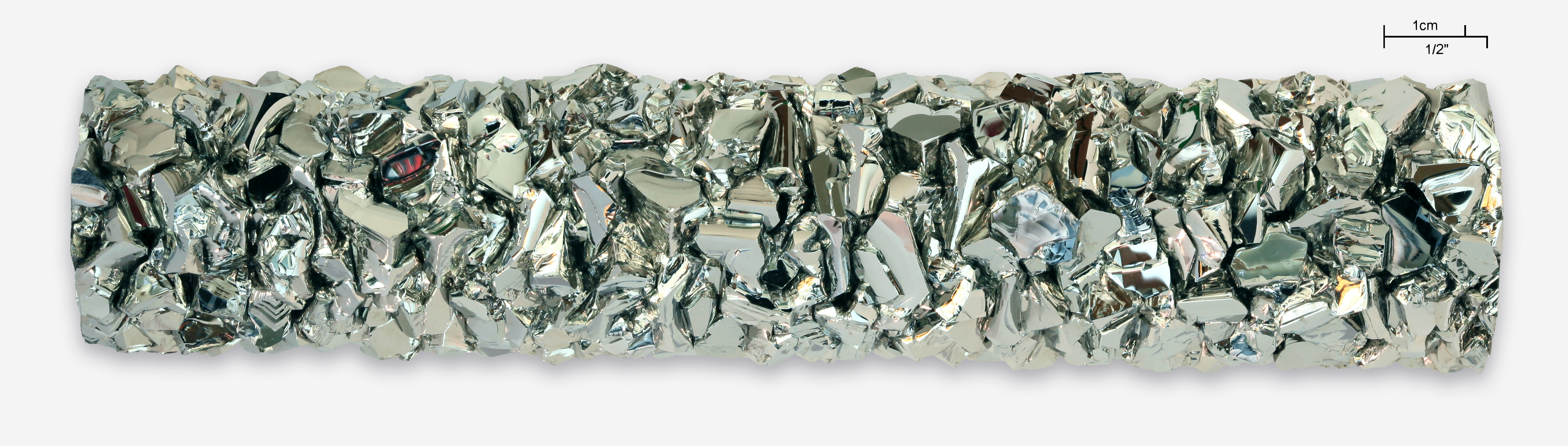
hafnium crystalline bar

In February 2003, the non-peer reviewed New Scientist wrote about the possibility of an IGE-powered airplane, a variant on nuclear propulsion. The idea was to utilize ^{178m2}Hf (presumably due to its high energy to weight ratio) which would be triggered to release gamma rays that would heat air in a chamber for jet propulsion. This power source is described as a "quantum nucleonic reactor", although it is not clear if this name exists only in reference to the New Scientist article.

=== Nuclear weaponry ===
It is partly this theoretical density that has made the entire IGE field so controversial. It has been suggested that the materials might be constructed to allow all of the stored energy to be released very quickly in a "burst". The possible energy release of the gammas alone would make IGE a potential high power "explosive" on its own, or a potential radiological weapon.

==== Fusion bomb ignition ====
The density of gammas produced in this reaction would be high enough that it might allow them to be used to compress the fusion fuel of a fusion bomb. If this turns out to be the case, it might allow a fusion bomb to be constructed with no fissile material inside (i.e. a pure fusion weapon); it is the control of the fissile material and the means for making it that underlies most attempts to stop nuclear proliferation.

== See also ==
- Particle-induced gamma emission

== Literature ==
- C. B. Collins; N. C. Zoita; F. Davanloo; Y. Yoda; T. Uruga; J. M. Pouvesle; I. I. Popescu (2005). "Nuclear resonance spectroscopy of the 31-yr isomer of Hf-178". Laser Physics Letters. 2 (3): 162. Bibcode:2005LaPhL...2..162C. doi:10.1002/lapl.200410154. S2CID 121707178.
- I. Ahmad; et al. (2001). "Search for X-Ray Induced Acceleration of the Decay of the 31-Yr Isomer of ^{178}Hf Using Synchrotron Radiation". Physical Review Letters. 87 (7) 072503. Bibcode:2001PhRvL..87g2503A. doi:10.1103/PhysRevLett.87.072503. PMID 11497887.
- I. Ahmad; et al. (2003). "Search for x-ray induced decay of the 31-yr isomer of ^{178}Hf at low x-ray energies". Physical Review C. 67 (4): 041305R. Bibcode:2003PhRvC..67d1305A. doi:10.1103/PhysRevC.67.041305. S2CID 209833094.
- C. B. Collins (1990). "Proof of the Feasibility of Coherent and Incoherent Schemes for Pumping a Gamma Ray Laser" (pdf). DTIC. Report No. GRL/9001. Archived from the original on June 1, 2022.
