= Nuclear explosion =

Explosion from fission or fusion reaction

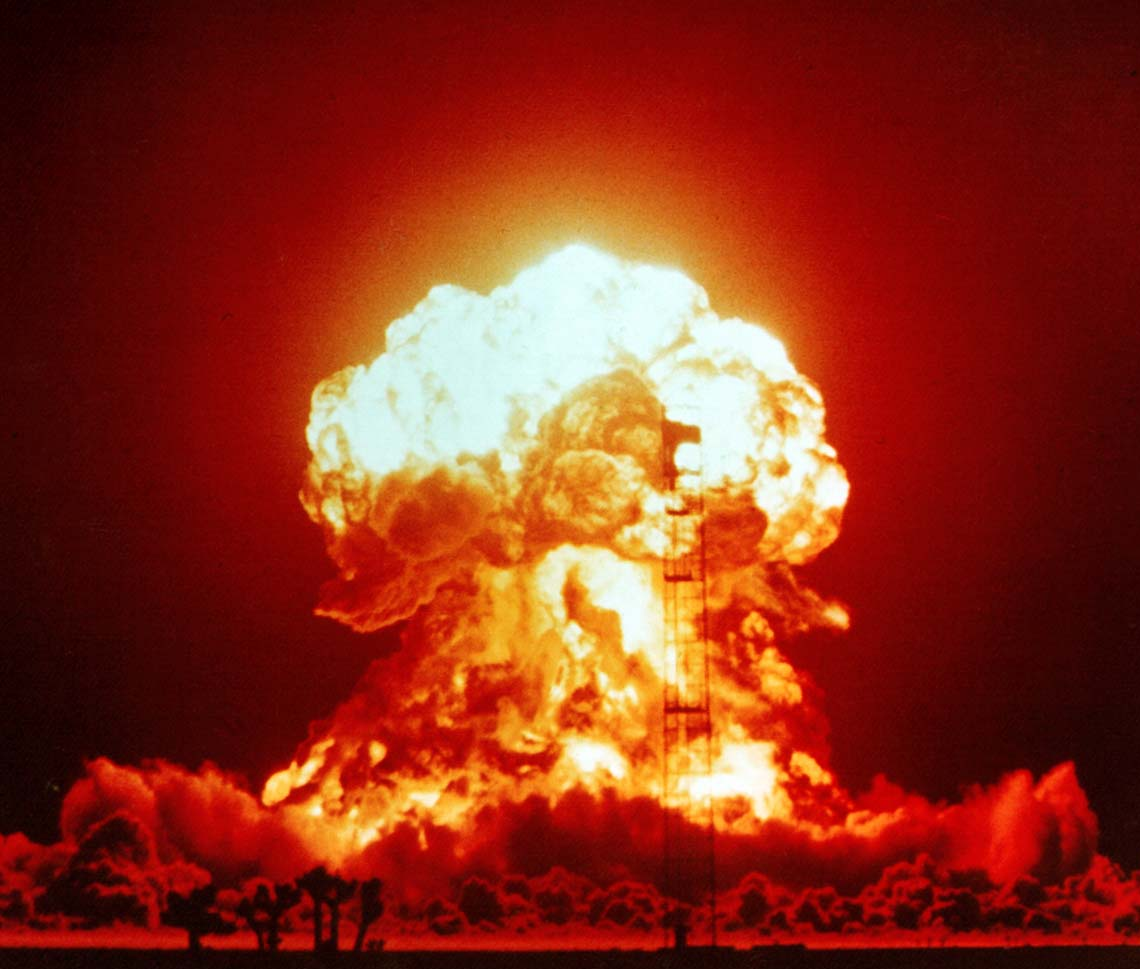
A 23 kiloton tower shot called BADGER, fired on April 18, 1953, at the Nevada Test Site, as part of the Operation Upshot–Knothole nuclear test series.

The Greenhouse George test early fireball.

Upshot–Knothole Grable test (film)

A nuclear explosion is an explosion that occurs as a result of the rapid release of energy from a high-speed nuclear reaction. The driving reaction may be nuclear fission or nuclear fusion or a multi-stage cascading combination of the two, though to date all fusion-based weapons have used a fission device to initiate fusion, and a pure fusion weapon remains a hypothetical device. Nuclear explosions are used in nuclear weapons and nuclear testing.

Nuclear explosions are extremely destructive compared to conventional (chemical) explosives, because of the vastly greater energy density of nuclear fuel compared to chemical explosives. They are often associated with mushroom clouds, since any large atmospheric explosion can create such a cloud. Nuclear explosions produce high levels of ionizing radiation and radioactive debris that is harmful to humans and can cause moderate to severe skin burns, eye damage, radiation sickness, radiation-induced cancer and possible death depending on how far a person is from the blast radius. Nuclear explosions can also have detrimental effects on the climate, lasting from months to years. A small-scale nuclear war could release enough particles into the atmosphere to cause the planet to cool and cause crops, animals, and agriculture to disappear across the globe—an effect named nuclear winter.

Astrophysical explosions driven by nuclear reactions include novae and Type Ia supernova.

== History ==
=== Fission explosions ===
The first manmade nuclear explosion occurred on July 16, 1945, at 5:50 am on the Trinity test site near Alamogordo, New Mexico, in the United States, an area now known as the White Sands Missile Range. The event involved the full-scale testing of an implosion-type fission atomic bomb. In a memorandum to the U.S. Secretary of War, General Leslie Groves describes the yield as equivalent to 15,000 to 20,000 tons of TNT. Following this test, a uranium-gun type nuclear bomb (Little Boy) was dropped on the Japanese city of Hiroshima on August 6, 1945, with a blast yield of 15 kilotons; and a plutonium implosion-type bomb (Fat Man) on Nagasaki on August 9, 1945, with a blast yield of 21 kilotons. Fat Man and Little Boy are the only instances in history of nuclear weapons being used as an act of war.

On August 29, 1949, the USSR became the second country to successfully test a nuclear weapon. RDS-1, dubbed "First Lightning" by the Soviets and "Joe-1" by the US, produced a 20 kiloton explosion and was essentially a copy of the American Fat Man plutonium implosion design.

=== Fusion explosions ===
The first explosion involving thermonuclear fusion was the 1951 US Greenhouse George test, using a deuterium-tritium mixture. The United States' first two-stage thermonuclear weapon, Ivy Mike, was detonated on 1 November 1952 at Enewetak Atoll and yielded 10 megatons of explosive force. The first thermonuclear weapon tested by the USSR, RDS-6s (Joe-4), was detonated on August 12, 1953, at the Semipalatinsk Test Site in Kazakhstan and yielded about 400 kilotons. RDS-6s' design, nicknamed the Sloika, was remarkably similar to a version designed for the U.S. by Edward Teller nicknamed the "Alarm Clock", in that the nuclear device was a two-stage weapon: the first explosion was triggered by fission and the second more powerful explosion by fusion. The Sloika core consisted of a series of concentric spheres with alternating materials to help boost the explosive yield.

=== Proliferation ===
In the years following World War II, eight countries have conducted nuclear tests with 2475 devices fired in 2120 tests. In 1963, the United States, Soviet Union, and United Kingdom signed the Limited Test Ban Treaty, pledging to refrain from testing nuclear weapons in the atmosphere, underwater, or in outer space. The treaty permitted underground tests. Many other non-nuclear nations acceded to the Treaty following its entry into force; however, France and China (both nuclear weapons states) have not.

The primary application to date has been military (i.e. nuclear weapons), and the remainder of explosions include the following:

- Nuclear pulse propulsion, including using a nuclear explosion as asteroid deflection strategy.
- Power generation; see PACER
- Peaceful nuclear explosions

=== Post-Cold War ===
With the 1996 signing of the Comprehensive Nuclear-Test-Ban Treaty, underground nuclear testing ceased globally, with the exception of 1998 tests by India and Pakistan.

In the 21st century, the only country to carry out conventional nuclear weapons testing is North Korea. Their program has carried out six tests, beginning a fission device in 2006 and most recently testing a possible two-stage fusion device in 2017.

Besides bomb testing, one nuclear explosion i.e. fission chain reaction is believed to have taken place in the 2019 Nyonoksa radiation accident in Russia.

Additionally, very small fusion explosions have taken place since the 1970s in various inertial confinement fusion facilities around the world. Although pure fusion weapons are not believed to be possessed or researched by any state, these experiments advance stockpile stewardship for nuclear states.

== Nuclear weapons ==
Two nuclear weapons have been deployed in combat—both by the United States against Japan in World War II. The first event occurred on the morning of 6 August 1945, when the United States Army Air Forces dropped a uranium gun-type device, code-named "Little Boy", on the city of Hiroshima, killing 70,000 people, including 20,000 Japanese combatants and 20,000 Korean slave laborers. The second event occurred three days later when the United States Army Air Forces dropped a plutonium implosion-type device, code-named "Fat Man", on the city of Nagasaki. It killed 39,000 people, including 27,778 Japanese munitions employees, 2,000 Korean slave laborers, and 150 Japanese combatants. In total, around 109,000 people were killed in these bombings. Nuclear weapons are largely seen as a 'deterrent' by most governments; the sheer scale of the destruction caused by nuclear weapons has discouraged their use in warfare.

=== Nuclear testing ===
Since the Trinity test and excluding combat use, countries with nuclear weapons have detonated roughly 1,700 nuclear explosions, all but six as tests. Of these, six were peaceful nuclear explosions. Nuclear tests are experiments carried out to determine the effectiveness, yield and explosive capability of nuclear weapons. Throughout the 20th century, most nations that have developed nuclear weapons had a staged test of them. Testing nuclear weapons can yield information about how the weapons work, as well as how the weapons behave under various conditions and how structures behave when subjected to a nuclear explosion. Additionally, nuclear testing has often been used as an indicator of scientific and military strength, and many tests have been overtly political in their intention; most nuclear weapons states publicly declared their nuclear status by means of a nuclear test. Nuclear tests have taken place at more than 60 locations across the world; some in secluded areas and others more densely populated. Detonation of nuclear weapons (in a test or during war) releases radioactive fallout that concerned the public in the 1950s. This led to the Limited Test Ban Treaty of 1963 signed by the United States, Great Britain, and the Soviet Union. This treaty banned nuclear weapons testing in the atmosphere, outer space, and under water.

== Legal distinctions ==
=== Fission ===
The 1996 Comprehensive Nuclear-Test-Ban Treaty bans all nuclear explosions by all parties. In the context of fission, this was pushed by the United States as a "zero-yield" standard:

The negotiating record makes clear that the CTBT permits no yield at all from fission explosions-- not one kiloton; not one ton; not one kilogram; not one milligram of fission yield.

According to Garwin and Simonenko, the Treaty was not intended to and therefore does not apply to any nuclear reactor experiments. This includes accident testing of fast reactors, even with both prompt and fast neutrons, like a bomb test would. As long as there is no "understanding or advancement of nuclear weapon design" gained, the Treaty does not apply.

Very small fission yields are produced during National Ignition Facility experiments as 14 MeV neutrons fission heavy element nuclei, especially depleted uranium in the hohlraum.

=== Fusion ===
The US Stockpile Stewardship and Management Program established at the end of the Cold War provided for the continued computational and experimental verification of the stockpiled fusion weapons' reliability. The US, UK, France, Russia, and China have all achieved laser inertial confinement fusion "shots", small implosions followed by rapid fusion energy release i.e. explosion.

A component of the US SSMP is the 1997 National Ignition Facility. In 1999 the US Department of Energy, in response to concern from Senator Tom Harkin, stated “NIF experiments are not considered nuclear explosions” and that “the large size of the facilities required to achieve inertial confinement fusion rules out weaponization”. In 1998, Princeton policy researchers published "The question of pure fusion explosions under the CTBT". They sought a ban on testing above 10^{14} neutrons, and on the use of tritium, which enhances the yield approximately twenty-fold versus deuterium-deuterium reactions, and forms the majority of the fusion yield in boosted and thermonuclear weapons. These were not adopted, and fusion yield has increased 11,000 times since then.

In 2022, the NIF achieved 3.15 MJ and for the first time an energy gain greater than one, equivalent to the chemical explosion of 752 grams of TNT, or three sticks of dynamite, and on a timescale of nanoseconds instead of a chemical explosive's milliseconds. This led to increased concern over the status of such experiments under the Treaty, and the development of pure fusion weapons.

== Effects of nuclear explosions ==
=== Shockwaves and radiation ===
The dominant effect of a nuclear weapon (the blast and thermal radiation) are the same physical damage mechanisms as conventional explosives, but the energy produced by a nuclear explosive is millions of times more per gram and the temperatures reached are in the tens of megakelvin. About half of the energy released appears as blast and shock, roughly a third as thermal radiation, and the remainder as prompt and residual nuclear radiation. Because thermal radiation travels at the speed of light, the flash of heat reaches an observer several seconds ahead of the blast wave, and for large weapons it can start fires and cause third-degree burns at distances of tens of kilometres. Nuclear weapons are quite different from conventional weapons because of the huge amount of explosive energy that they can put out and the different kinds of effects they make, like high temperatures and ionizing radiation.

The devastating impact of the explosion does not stop after the initial blast, as with conventional explosives. A cloud of nuclear radiation travels from the hypocenter of the explosion, causing an impact to life forms even after the heat waves have ceased. The health effects on humans from nuclear explosions comes from the initial shockwave, the radiation exposure, and the fallout. The initial shockwave and radiation exposure come from the immediate blast which has different effects on the health of humans depending on the distance from the center of the blast. The shockwave can rupture eardrums and lungs, can also throw people back, and cause buildings to collapse. Radiation exposure is delivered at the initial blast and can continue for an extended amount of time in the form of nuclear fallout. The main health effect of nuclear fallout is cancer and birth defects because radiation causes changes in cells that can either kill or make them abnormal. Any nuclear explosion (or nuclear war) would have wide-ranging, long-term, catastrophic effects. Radioactive contamination would cause genetic mutations and cancer across many generations.

=== Nuclear winter ===
Another potential devastating effect of nuclear war is termed nuclear winter. The idea became popularized in mainstream culture during the 1980s, when Richard P. Turco, Owen Toon, Thomas P. Ackerman, James B. Pollack and Carl Sagan collaborated and produced a scientific study which suggested the Earth's weather and climate can be severely affected by nuclear war. The main idea is that once a conflict begins and the aggressors start detonating nuclear weapons, the explosions will eject small particles from the Earth's surface into the atmosphere as well as nuclear particles. It's also assumed that fires will break out and become widespread, similar to what happened at Hiroshima and Nagasaki during the end of WWII, which will cause soot and other harmful particles to also be introduced into the atmosphere. Once these harmful particles are lofted, strong upper-level winds in the troposphere can transport them thousands of kilometers and can end up transporting nuclear fallout and also alter the Earth's radiation budget. Once enough small particles are in the atmosphere, they can act as cloud condensation nuclei which will cause global cloud coverage to increase which in turn blocks incoming solar insolation and starts a global cooling period. This is not unlike one of the leading theories about the extinction of most dinosaur species, in that a large explosion ejected small particulate matter into the atmosphere and resulted in a global catastrophe characterized by cooler temperatures, acid rain, and the KT Layer.

== See also ==
- Lists of nuclear disasters and radioactive incidents
- Soviet nuclear well collapses
- Visual depictions of nuclear explosions in fiction
