= Pure fusion weapon =

Hypothetical nuclear weapon

Diagram of deuterium-tritium fusion

A pure fusion weapon is a hypothetical hydrogen bomb design that does not need a fission "primary" explosive to ignite the fusion of deuterium and tritium, two heavy isotopes of hydrogen used in fission-fusion thermonuclear weapons. Such a weapon would require no fissile material and would therefore be much easier to develop in secret than existing weapons. Separating weapons-grade uranium (U-235) or breeding plutonium (Pu-239) requires a substantial and difficult-to-conceal industrial investment, and blocking the sale and transfer of the needed machinery has been the primary mechanism to control nuclear proliferation to date.

== Explanation ==
All current thermonuclear weapons use a fission bomb as a first stage to create the enormous temperatures and pressures necessary to start a fusion reaction between deuterium and tritium in a second stage. For many years, nuclear weapon designers have researched whether it is possible to create high enough temperatures and pressures inside a confined space to ignite a fusion reaction, without using fission. Pure fusion weapons offer the possibility of generating arbitrarily small nuclear yields because no critical mass of fissile fuel need be assembled for detonation, as with a conventional fission primary needed to spark a fusion explosion. There is also the advantage of reduced collateral damage stemming from fallout because these weapons would not create the highly radioactive byproducts made by fission-type weapons. These weapons would be lethal not only because of their explosive force, which could be large compared to bombs based on chemical explosives, but also because of the neutrons they generate.

While various neutron source devices have been developed, some of them based on fusion reactions, none of them are able to produce a net energy yield, either in controlled form for energy production or uncontrolled for a weapon.

== Progress ==
Despite the many millions of dollars spent by the U.S. between 1952 and 1992 to produce a pure fusion weapon, no measurable success was ever achieved. In 1998, the U.S. Department of Energy (DOE) released a restricted data declassification decision stating that even if the DOE made a substantial investment in the past to develop a pure fusion weapon, "the U.S. is not known to have and is not developing a pure fusion weapon and no credible design for a pure fusion weapon resulted from the DOE investment". The power densities needed to ignite a fusion reaction still seem attainable only with the aid of a fission explosion, or with large apparatus such as powerful lasers like those at the National Ignition Facility, the Sandia Z-pinch machine, or various magnetic tokamaks. Regardless of any claimed advantages of pure fusion weapons, building those weapons does not appear to be feasible using currently available technologies and many have expressed concern that pure fusion weapons research and development would subvert the intent of the Nuclear Non-Proliferation Treaty and the Comprehensive Test Ban Treaty.

It has been claimed that it is possible to conceive of a crude, deliverable, pure fusion weapon, using only present-day, unclassified technology. The weapon design weighs approximately 3 tonnes, and might have a total yield of approximately 3 tonnes of TNT. The proposed design uses a large explosively pumped flux compression generator to produce the high power density required to ignite the fusion fuel. From the point of view of explosive damage, such a weapon would have no clear advantages over a conventional explosive, but the massive neutron flux could deliver a lethal dose of radiation to humans within a 500-meter radius (most of those fatalities would occur over a period of months, rather than immediately).

== Alternative fusion trigger ==
Some researchers have examined the use of antimatter as an alternative fusion trigger, mainly in the context of antimatter-catalyzed nuclear pulse propulsion but also nuclear weapons. Such a system, in a weapons context, would have many of the desired properties of a pure fusion weapon. The technical barriers to producing and containing the required quantities of antimatter appear formidable, well beyond present capabilities.

Induced gamma emission is another approach that is currently being researched. Very high energy-density chemicals such as ballotechnics and others have also been suggested as a means of triggering a pure fusion weapon.

Nuclear isomers have also been investigated for use in pure fusion weaponry. Hafnium and tantalum isomers can be induced to emit very strong gamma radiation. Gamma emission from these isomers may have enough energy to start a thermonuclear reaction, without requiring any fissile material (See also hafnium controversy).
