= Academicians' letter =

The letter by 10 academicians or Academicians' letter (short names of "Open letter from ten Members of the Russian Academy of Sciences to the President"; Russian: Открытое письмо десяти академиков РАН президенту Российской Федерации В.В. Путину) is an open letter to the President of the Russian Federation in which ten notable scientists expressed their concern about rapid clericalization of Russian society. It was published on July 22, 2007.

== Main issues ==
The letter was intended to warn both the society and the government about the growing influence of the Russian Orthodox Church and its expansion into many fields of social life, particularly into the state education system, which is strictly prohibited under the Russian Constitution.

=== Theology in VAK list ===
The letter addresses the inadmissibility of "theology" being added to the science fields list of the Higher Attestation Commission (VAK). Such an idea was proposed in the resolution of the 11th Russian national synod (Russian: XI Всемирный русский национальный собор).

=== Religion in schools ===
The Russian orthodox church tried to introduce the basics of religious education into the public education system. Church leaders proposed to include a corresponding discipline into school curriculum. The Eleventh Russian national assembly took a resolution, expressing a hope that the basics of Christian teaching would be obligatory in schools.

Authors mention an order (letter) by Patriarch of Moscow and all Rus', Alexey the Second in which he states "if we have difficulty introducing 'Basics of Russian Orthodox Faith', we can simply call it 'Basics of Russian Orthodox Culture'. In this case the course certainly won't meet any objections from teachers and principals, raised under atheistic rule."

== Response ==
The letter lead to a nationwide discussion on church and state interaction. Previously, corresponding issues drew little public attention.

=== Official response of the Church ===
The Russian Orthodox Church stated that it "always appreciated science and continues to appreciate and respect science nowadays". The Patriarch, commenting on the letter said that "the church strictly abides to the Constitution. Neither the Church interferes into the state matters, nor the state interferes with religious affairs". Both the letter and its signatories were criticised by various orthodox activists. The religious movement "Natsyonalny Sobor" (Russian: Национальный собор) accused Vitaly Ginzburg of hate speech.

== Results ==
Before the letter, these issues were actively and publicly discussed only between the government of the Russian Federation and representatives of Russian Orthodox Church. After the letter, these issues have begun to be discussed by the general public. In this sense, an open letter to the President of the Russian Federation became an “information event” for discussing these and other issues related to the relationship between the church and society.

However, since 2012, in accordance with the order of the Russian Ministry of Education and Science, the subject of "Fundamentals of Religious Cultures and Secular Ethics" has been included in school curriculum as a federal component. Since 2015, the Higher Certification Commission of the Ministry of Education and Science of Russian Federation has approved Theology as a new scientific specialty. Thus, the opinion of the academicians could not affect the decision-making on these issues.

In 2019, school headmaster Eugene Yamburg shared his opinion on the results of state religious education: "Not so long ago a fourth-grader from another city was transferred to my school. She studied at the gymnasium, where she introduced elective courses: Orthodoxy, Islam, Judaism, secular ethics. And the girl says to me: “Eugene Sanych, you can’t imagine how fortunate it is that we are Orthodox.” I say: "No objection." “But you can’t imagine how much do I hate the Catholics!” I wonder: “For what?” “So, they pray to the Primadonna!” - the girl is indignant. Of course, I explained that the Primadonna is Alla Borisovna Pugacheva, and the Catholics are praying Madonna, the Orthodox Mother of God. The girl was amazed".

In 2020 Vladimir Putin initiated the inclusion of God and "traditional" (patriarchal nationalistic) values, including the priority of national laws over international agreements, in the Constitution of Russia.

== Signatories ==
- Eugene Alexandrov (Russian: Евгений Александров),
- Zhores Alferov (Russian: Жорес Алфёров),
- Garry Abelev (Russian: Гарри Абелев),
- Lev Barkov (Russian: Лев Барков),
- Andrey Vorobyev (Russian: Андрей Воробьёв),
- Vitaly Ginzburg (Russian: Виталий Гинзбург),
- Sergey Inge-Vechtomov (Russian: Сергей Инге-Вечтомов),
- Eduard Kruglyakov (Russian: Эдуард Кругляков),
- Mikhail Vissarionovich Sadovsky (Russian: Михаил Садовский),
- Anatoliy Cherepaschuk (Russian: Анатолий Черепащук)
