= Cyber Resilience Act =

Cybersecurity regulation in the European Union

Regulation 2024/2847
- European Union regulation
- Text with EEA relevance
- Title: Regulation (EU) 2024/2847 of the European Parliament and of the Council of 23 October 2024 on horizontal cybersecurity requirements for products with digital elements and amending Regulations (EU) No 168/2013 and (EU) No 2019/1020 and Directive (EU) 2020/1828 (Cyber Resilience Act)
- Made by: European Parliament, EU Council
- Made under: Treaty on the Functioning of the European Union, and in particular Article 114 thereof
- Journal reference: OJ L, 2024/2847, 20.11.2024

History
- Date made: 10 October 2024
- Entry into force: 12 November 2024
- Applies from: 11 December 2027

The Cyber Resilience Act (CRA) is an EU regulation for improving cybersecurity and cyber resilience, through common cybersecurity standards for products that have digital elements. For example, it requires incident reports and automatic security updates. Digital elements are, mainly, hardware and software whose "intended and foreseeable use includes direct or indirect data connection to a device or network".

The European Commission proposed the CRA on 15 September 2022. Subsequently, multiple FOSS organizations criticized the CRA for creating a "chilling effect on open source software development". After a series of amendments, the European Commission reached political agreement on the CRA on 1 December 2023. The revised bill includes an exception for open-source software. This was welcomed by many open source organizations, though Debian criticized its effect on small businesses and redistributors. The revised bill also introduced the "open source steward", a new economic concept. The European Parliament formally approved the CRA in March 2024. It was adopted by the Council on 10 October 2024.

== Purposes and motivations ==
The background, purposes and motivations for the proposed policy include:

- Consumers increasingly become victims to security flaws of digital products (e.g. vulnerabilities), including of Internet of Things devices or smart devices.
- Ensuring that digital products in the supply chain are secure is important for businesses, and cybersecurity often is a "full company risk issue".
- Potential impacts of hacking include "severe disruption of economic and social activities across the internal market, undermining security or even becoming life-threatening".
- Secure by default principles would impose a duty of care for the lifecycle of products, instead of e.g. relying on consumers and volunteers to establish a basic level of security. The new rules would "rebalance responsibility towards manufacturers".
- Cyberattacks have led to an estimated global annual cost of cybercrime of €9.4 trillion ($10.5 trillion USD) in 2025.
- The rapid spread of digital technologies means rogue states or non-state groups could more easily disrupt critical infrastructures such as public administration and hospitals.

According to The Washington Post, the CRA could make the EU a leader on cybersecurity and "change the rules of the game globally".

== Implementation and mechanisms ==
The policy requires software that are "reasonably expected" to have automatic updates should roll out security updates automatically by default while allowing users to opt out. When feasible, security updates should be separated from feature updates. Companies need to conduct cyber risk assessments before a product is put on the market and retain its data inventory and documentation throughout the 10 years after being put on market or its support period, whichever is longer. Companies would have to notify EU cybersecurity agency ENISA of any incidents within 24 hours of becoming aware of them, and take measures to resolve them. Products carrying the CE marking would "meet a minimum level of cybersecurity checks".

About 90% of products with digital elements fall under a default category, for which manufacturers will self-assess security, write an EU declaration of conformity, and provide technical documentation. The rest are either "important" or "critical". Security-important products are categorized into two classes of risks. Products assessed as 'critical' will need to undergo external audits.

Once the law has passed, manufacturers would have two years to adapt to the new requirements and one year to implement vulnerability and incident reporting. Failure to comply could result in fines of up to €15 million or 2.5 percent of the offender's total worldwide annual turnover for the preceding financial year. Fines do not apply to non-commercial open-source developers.

Euractiv has reported on novel drafts or draft-changes that includes changes like the "removal of time obligations for products' lifetime and limiting the scope of reporting to significant incidents". The first compromise amendment was discussed on 22 May 2023 until which groups reportedly could submit written comments. Euractiv provided a summary overview of the proposed changes.

The main political groups in the European Parliament are expected to agree on the Cyber Resilience Act at a meeting on 5 July 2023. Lawmakers will discuss open source considerations, support periods, reporting obligations, and the implementation timeline. The committee vote was on 19 July 2023.

The Spanish presidency of the EU Council has released a revised draft that simplifies the regulatory requirements for connected devices. It would reduce the number of product categories that must comply with specific regulations, mandate reporting of cybersecurity incidents to national CSIRTs, and include provisions for determining product lifetime and easing administrative burdens for small companies. The law also clarifies that spare parts with digital elements supplied by the original manufacturer are exempt from the new requirements.

The Council text further stipulates that prior to seeking compulsory certification, the European Union executives must undertake an impact assessment to evaluate both the supply and demand aspects of the internal market, as well as the member states' capacity and preparedness for implementing the proposed schemes.

On June 25, 2024, the Czech National Office for Cyber and Information Security (NÚKIB) announced steps to implement the Cyber Resilience Act (CRA), including a regulation expected in autumn 2024, with enforcement starting in late 2027 after a three-year transition. This regulation will require manufacturers of digital products to enhance cybersecurity throughout the product lifecycle. NÚKIB will also hold consultations with manufacturers of significant and critical products from June 25 to July 17, 2024, to develop technical specifications and gather feedback.

=== Examples ===
In September 2025 Andras Timar who joined the OpenOffice.org project in 2002 provided a presentation on the software bill of materials (SBOM) concept and its significance in open source projects, with a focus on LibreOffice. Following this, in October 2026 Andras Timar provided a summary of how this was achieved in Collabora Online and Collabora Office.

== Reception ==
Initially, the proposed act was heavily criticized by open-source advocates.

- Multiple open source organizations like the Eclipse Foundation, the Open Source Initiative (OSI), and The Document Foundation have signed the open letter "Open Letter to the European Commission on the Cyber Resilience Act", asking policy-makers to change the under-representation of the open source community. It finds that with the policy "[free and open source software,] more than 70% of the software in Europe[,] is about to be regulated without an in-depth consultation" and if implemented as written (as of April 2023) would have a "chilling effect on open source software development as a global endeavour, with the net effect of undermining the EU's own expressed goals for innovation, digital sovereignty, and future prosperity". The Apache Software Foundation published a similar statement, and OSI submitted this information to the European Commission's request for input.
- Although Mozilla "welcome[s] and support[s] the overarching goals of the CRA", it also criticised the proposal for unclear references to "commercial activity" that could include many open source projects (a viewpoint Ilkka Turunen of Computer Weekly repeated), misalignment with other EU rules, and requirements for the disclosure of unmitigated vulnerabilities.
- Steven J. Vaughan-Nichols of The Register argued the CRA's "underlying assumption is that you can just add security to software" while "[m]any open source developers have neither the revenue nor resources to secure their programs to a government standard".
- CCIA Europe warned that "the resulting red tape from the approval process could hamper the roll-out of new technologies and services in Europe".

FSFE Policy Consultant Alexander Sander summarizes key concerns in March 2023.

Amendments were released on 1 December 2023, as part of political agreement between co-legislators, to the acclaim of many open-source advocates. As Mike Milinkovich, executive director of the Eclipse Foundation, wrote:

The revised legislation has vastly improved its exclusion of open source projects, communities, foundations, and their development and package distribution platforms. It also creates a new form of economic actor, the “open source steward,” which acknowledges the role played by foundations and platforms in the open source ecosystem. This is the first time this has appeared in a regulation, and it will be interesting to see how this evolves.

— Mike Milinkovich, "Good News on the Cyber Resilience Act"

Debian had previously stated that many small businesses and solo developers would have trouble navigating the act when redistributing open source software. OSI noted that this issue remained unaddressed. Apache reviewed the changes positively while worrying about applicability of the CRA on potentially critical open-source components and stressing the importance of collaboration with international standards bodies to ease certification of software.

On 24 September 2024, the Eclipse Foundation launched the Open Regulatory Compliance working group to help open-source community participants navigate regulations and to facilitate dialogue with regulators. The group's initial focus is the CRA.

== See also ==
- NIS 2 Directive
- Artificial Intelligence Act
- Cyber Security and Resilience Bill—proposed UK legislation
- Consumer protection
- Cyber self-defense
- List of data breaches
- List of security hacking incidents § 2025
- Sustainable design
- Standardization
