= Hafnium controversy =

Gamma 'bomb' debate, 1997 to 2009

The hafnium controversy was a debate over the possibility of "triggering" rapid energy releases, via gamma-ray emission, from ^{178m2}Hf, a nuclear isomer of hafnium. The energy release per event is 5 orders of magnitude (100,000 times) higher than in a typical chemical reaction, but 2 orders of magnitude less than a nuclear fission reaction. In 1998, a group led by Carl Collins in the University of Texas at Dallas reported what they interpreted as evidence of such a trigger, but these results were not independently reproduced and remain controversial. Signal-to-noise ratios were small in those first experiments, and to date no other group has reproduced these results. Peter Zimmerman (an American nuclear physicist and arms-control expert) described claims of weaponization potential as having been based on "very bad science".

== Background ==
^{178m2}Hf is a particularly interesting candidate for induced gamma emission (IGE) experiments, because ^{178m2}Hf's energy is 2.5 MeV per nucleus higher than that of ground-state ^{178}Hf, and it has a long (31-year) half life. If lower-energy radiation could induce gamma emission in the isomer before competing processes dissipated that energy, it might, in principle, start a cascade of gamma photons. The long half-life of ^{178m2}Hf might make it possible to engineer a substance with enough of these energetic nuclei needed for stimulated emission, i.e. a gamma-ray laser. While induced emission of a high-energy photon by a lower-energy photon adds power to a radiation field, stimulated emission adds coherence.

With all the caveats about dissipation of the triggering photon, and its efficient recreation by the energetic photon that is being triggered, the process could, in principle, lead to nuclear reaction engines, along with more precise radiometric devices. A proposal to show the efficacy for "triggering" ^{178m2}Hf was approved by a NATO Advanced Research Workshop (NATO-ARW) held in Predeal in 1995. Although the proposal was to use incident protons to bombard the target, α-particles were available when the first experiment was scheduled. It was done by a French, Russian, Romanian and American team. Results were said to be extraordinary but were not published. Nevertheless, ^{178m2}Hf was implied to be of special importance for potential applications of IGE. A controversy quickly erupted, mostly between the original proponents of ^{178m2}Hf as having potential military applications as a gamma-ray laser weapon or a non-neutronic but still nuclear-like explosive, and critics who discounted such possibilities due to practical obstacles along the way: ^{178m2}Hf is difficult to make and virtually impossible to separate from the ground-state ^{178}Hf, the absorption of lower-energy triggering X-rays by the bound electrons around the Hf nucleus, and the minute probability of recreating the trigger-capable X-ray starting with the triggered X-ray itself by multiple random scattering. Still, the potential military application was enticing enough to try to make ^{178m2}Hf into something useful (rather than an intriguing nucleus suitable for academic study only).

== Importance ==
- ^{178m2}Hf has the highest excitation energy of any comparably long-lived isomer. One gram of pure ^{178m2}Hf contains approximately 1330 megajoules of energy, about 300 kilograms (660 pounds) of TNT equivalent. The half-life of ^{178m2}Hf is 31 years, or 1 Gs (gigasecond, 1,000,000,000 seconds), so that natural radioactivity of one gram is 2.40 TBq (65 Ci). The activity is in a cascade of penetrating gamma rays, the most energetic of which is 0.574 MeV. Substantial shielding would be needed for human safety if the sample were to be one gram of the pure isomer. However, so far the nuclear isomer exists only at low concentrations (<0.1%), within multi-isotopic hafnium.
- All energy released would be in the form of photons: X-rays and gamma rays.
- In theoretical estimates, if all stored energy were released rapidly, a gram of pure ^{178m2}Hf might emit an intense photon burst; however, these conditions have not been achieved experimentally.
- The characteristic scales of times for processes involved in applications would be favorable for consuming all of the initial radioactivity. The process for triggering a sample by IGE would use photons to trigger and produce photons as a product. The propagation of photons occurs at the speed of light, while mechanical disassembly of the target would proceed with a velocity comparable to that of sound. Untriggered ^{178m2}Hf material might not be able to get away from a triggered event if the photons did not interact first with the electrons.
- Both the proposal to the NATO-ARW and the fragmentary results from the subsequent experiment indicated that the energy of the photon needed to initiate IGE from ^{178m2}Hf would be less than 300 keV. Many economical sources of such low-energy X-rays were available for delivering quite large fluxes to target samples of modest dimensions.
- Samples of ^{178m2}Hf were and remain available only at low concentrations (<0.1%), without any clear way to increase this concentration.

== Chronology of notable events ==
- Around 1997, the JASONS advisory group took testimony about the triggering of nuclear isomers. The JASON Defense Advisory Group published a relevant public report saying that they concluded that such a thing would be impossible and should not be attempted. Despite intervening publications in peer-reviewed journals of articles written by an international team reporting IGE from ^{178m2}Hf, around 2003 IDA took testimony, again from relevant scientists on matters of the credibility of reported results. Professor Carl Collins, the lead U.S. member of the team publishing the successes, did not testify.
- Around 2003, DARPA initiated exploratory research termed stimulated isomer energy release (SIER) and public interest was aroused, at both popular levels and at professional levels.
- The first focus of SIER was whether significant amounts of ^{178m2}Hf could be produced at acceptable costs for possible applications. A closed panel called HIPP was charged with the task and concluded that it could. However, a scientist on that confidential DARPA HIPP review panel "leaked" prejudicial but preliminary concerns to the press. This unsubstantiated assertion set into motion the subsequent cascade of inaccurate reports about the so-called "outrageous costs" of isomer triggering.
- Having satisfied the charge to the HIPP panel to explore the problem of production at acceptable cost, the SIER program turned to the matter of definitive confirmation of the reports of IGE from ^{178m2}Hf. A task of TRiggering Isomer Proof (TRIP) was mandated by DARPA and assigned to a completely independent team from those reporting success previously. The "gold standard" of hafnium-isomer triggering was set as the Rusu dissertation. The TRIP experiment required independent confirmation of the Rusu dissertation. It was successful, but could not be published.
- By 2006, the Collins team had published multiple papers supporting their initial observations of IGE from ^{178m2}Hf. Reprints (available at the link) of articles that were published after 2001 describe work conducted with tunable monochromatic X-ray beams from the synchrotron light sources SPring-8 in Hyogo and SLS in Villigen.
- Independent synchrotron experiments with broader X-ray spectra failed to observe induced gamma emission, and theoretical analyses further challenged the feasibility of the proposed mechanism. By 2006, there were 2 articles that claimed to disprove possibilities for IGE from ^{178m2}Hf and three theoretical articles written by the same individual saying why it should not be possible to occur by the particular steps the author envisioned. The first two described synchrotron experiments in which the X-rays were not monochromatic.
- In 2007, Pereira et al. estimated that the cost of the electrical energy to store energy in the nuclear isomer is on the order of $1/J; building and maintaining the particle accelerator needed for the purpose is extra. Any reasonable explosive device, e.g., a hand grenade, may contain from 10 to 100 g of TNT, corresponding to 40 to 400 kJ, at a cost of tens of dollars or at least 10,000 times less than this estimate for isomeric energy content in the nucleus. Such an excessive cost makes any device based on nuclear isomers much too expensive to be practical, and research motivated by potential applications thereof a waste of money (in contrast to research on nuclear isomers purely for scientific purposes that do not claim any practicality).
- On February 29, 2008, DARPA distributed some of the 150 copies of the final report of the TRIP experiment that had independently confirmed the "gold standard" of hafnium-isomer triggering. Sustained by peer review, the 94-page report is distributed for official use only (FOUO) by the DARPA Technical Information Office, 3701 N. Fairfax Dr., Arlington, VA 22203 USA.
- On October 9, 2008, LLNL released the 110-page evaluation of the DARPA TRIP experiment. Quoting from page 33, "Overall, the X-ray ^{178m2}Hf experiments by Collins et al. are statistically marginal and inconsistent. None of the reported positive triggering results were confirmed by independent groups, including those experiments performed by former collaborators (Carroll). " In addition, the report summary states, page 65: "Our conclusion is that the utilization of nuclear isomers for energy storage is impractical from the points of view of nuclear structure, nuclear reactions, and of prospects for controlled energy release. We note that the cost of producing the nuclear isomer is likely to be extraordinarily high, and that the technologies that would be required to perform the task are beyond anything done before and are difficult to cost at this time."
- In 2009, S.A. Karamian et al. published the results of a four-nation team's experimental measurements at the Joint Institute for Nuclear Research for the production of quantities of ^{178m2}Hf by spallation at energies as low as 80 MeV. In addition to significantly lowering the projected cost of production, this experimental result proved the accessibility to sources of ^{178m2}Hf to be within the capabilities of the several idle cyclotron devices scattered around the world.
