= Nuclear isomer =

Metastable excited state of a nuclide

A nuclear isomer is a metastable state of an atomic nucleus in which one or more nucleons (protons or neutrons) occupy excited state levels (higher energy levels). "Metastable" describes nuclei whose excited states have half-lives of 10^{−9} seconds or longer, 100 to 1000 times longer than the half-lives of the excited nuclear states that decay with a "prompt" half-life (ordinarily on the order of 10^{−12} seconds). Some references recommend using a threshold of 5×10^{−9} seconds to distinguish the metastable half-life from the normal "prompt" gamma-emission half-life.

The half-lives of a number of isomers are far longer than this and may be minutes, hours, or years. The most extreme example known is the ^{180m}_{73}Ta nuclear isomer, which survives so long (at least 2.9×10^{17} years) that it has never been observed to decay spontaneously, and occurs naturally as a primordial nuclide, though uncommonly at only 1/8000 of all tantalum. The second most stable isomer is ^{210m}_{83}Bi, which does not occur naturally; its half-life is 3.04×10^{6} years to alpha decay. The half-life of a nuclear isomer can exceed that of the ground state of the same nuclide, as with the two above, as well as, for example, ^{186m}_{75}Re, ^{192m2}_{77}Ir, ^{212m}_{84}Po, ^{242m}_{95}Am and multiple holmium isomers.

The gamma decay from a metastable state is referred to as isomeric transition (IT), or internal transition, though it resembles shorter-lived "prompt" gamma decays in all external aspects with the exception of the longer life. This is generally associated with a high nuclear spin change, or "forbiddenness", which would be required in gamma emission to reach the ground state; this is even more true of beta decays. A low transition energy both slows the transition rate and makes it more likely that only highly forbidden decays are available, so most long-lived isomers have a relatively low excitation energy above the ground state (in the extreme case of thorium-229m, low excitation alone causes the measurably long life). In ^{210m}_{83}Bi, the forbiddenness of available beta and gamma decays is so high that alpha decay is observed exclusively, though even that is slower than for the ground state. For most lighter isomers including ^{180m}_{73}Ta, alpha decay is not practically available, but others are not quite so forbidden as those two.

The first nuclear isomer and decay-daughter system (uranium X_{2}/uranium Z, now known as ^{234m}_{91}Pa/^{234}_{91}Pa) was discovered by Otto Hahn in 1921.

Metastable isomers can be produced through any nuclear reaction, including radioactive decay, neutron capture, nuclear fission, and bombardment by accelerated charged particles. A nucleus produced this way generally starts its existence in an excited state that loses its excess energy through the emission of one or more gamma rays or conversion electrons. This is normally a "prompt" process, but sometimes does not rapidly reach to the nuclear ground state, in which case a metastable isomer has formed. This usually occurs as a spin isomer when the formation of an intermediate excited state has a spin far different from that of the ground state. Gamma-ray emission is hindered if the spin of the post-emission state differs greatly from that of the emitting state, and if the excitation energy is low; such excited states will generally have long lives and be considered metastable.

After fission, several of the fission fragments may be produced in a metastable isomeric state, after their prompt de-excitation. At the end of this process, the nuclei can populate both the ground and the isomeric states. If the half-life of an isomer is long enough, it is possible to measure its production rate, and comparing it to that of the ground state gives the so-called isomeric yield ratio.

A particular kind of metastable isomer is the fission isomer or shape isomer. Most actinide nuclei in their ground states are not spherical, but rather prolate spheroidal, with an axis of symmetry longer than the other axes, similar to an American football or rugby ball. This geometry can result in quantum-mechanical states where the distribution of protons and neutrons is so much further from spherical geometry that de-excitation to the nuclear ground state is strongly hindered. In general, these states either return to the ground state, or undergo spontaneous fission, with half-lives of the order of nanoseconds or microseconds, meaning it is metastable. Fission isomers may be specified with a postscript or superscript "f" rather than "m", so that a fission isomer, e.g. of plutonium-240, can be denoted as plutonium-240f or ^{240f}_{94}Pu.

== Nomenclature ==
Metastable isomers of a particular isotope are usually designated with an "m". This designation is placed after the mass number of the atom.

For example, cobalt-58m1, or ^{58m1}_{27}Co, is an isomer of cobalt-58. Here, 27 is the atomic number of cobalt, 58 is the total number of nucleons (meaning it has 31 neutrons), "m" means it is an isomer, and "m1" means it is the first (lowest above the ground state) metastable isomer.

For isotopes with more than one metastable isomer, "indices" are placed after the designation, and the labeling becomes m1, m2, m3, and so on. Increasing indices, m1, m2, etc., correlate with increasing levels of excitation energy stored in each of the isomeric states (e.g., hafnium-178m2, or ^{178m2}_{72}Hf). The index may be omitted if only one isomer is relevant in-context.

For fission isomers, use "f" rather than "m".

== Artificial de-excitation ==
^{180m}Ta can be forced to release its energy by X-rays. This was predicted theoretically in 1988 by C. B. Collins, although at that time this de-excitation mechanism had never been observed. This was observed in ^{180m}Ta by resonant photo-excitation of intermediate high levels of this nucleus (E ≈ 1 MeV), in 1999 by Belic and co-workers in the Stuttgart nuclear physics group.

^{178m2}_{72}Hf is another reasonably stable nuclear isomer, with a half-life of 31 years and a remarkably high excitation energy for that life. In its natural decay, 2.45 MeV is released as gamma rays. As with ^{180m}Ta, it is thought that ^{178m2}Hf can be stimulated into releasing its energy. Due to this, the substance has been studied as a possible source for gamma-ray lasers, and reports have indicated that the energy could be released very quickly, so that ^{178m2}Hf can produce extremely high powers (on the order of exawatts). It was supposedly detected experimentally in the 2000s, but it was controversial and not independently confirmed.

Other isomers have also been investigated as possible media for gamma-ray stimulated emission.

== Other notable isomers ==
Holmium's nuclear isomer ^{166m1}_{67}Ho has a half-life of 1,133 years, which is nearly the longest half-life of any holmium radionuclide. Only ^{163}Ho, with a half-life of 4,570 years, is more stable. Both the excitation energy of the former, and the decay energy of the latter, are less than 10 keV.

^{229m}_{90}Th is a remarkably low-lying metastable isomer, only 8.355733554021(8) eV above the ground state. This low energy produces light at a wavelength of 148.3821828827(15) nm, in the far ultraviolet instead of the typical gamma ray band. This allows for direct nuclear laser spectroscopy. Such ultra-precise spectroscopy, however, could not begin without a sufficiently precise initial estimate of the wavelength, something that was only achieved in 2024 after two decades (from 2003 to 2024) of effort. The energy is so low that the ionization state of the atom affects its half-life. Neutral ^{229m}_{90}Th decays by internal conversion with a half-life of 7±1 μs, but because the isomeric energy is less than thorium's second ionization energy of 11.5 eV, this channel is forbidden in thorium cations and ^{229m}_{90}Th^{+} decays by gamma emission with a half-life of 1740±50 s. This conveniently moderate lifetime allows the development of a nuclear clock of unprecedented accuracy.

== Mechanism ==
=== Nuclear orbital theory ===
The nucleus of a nuclear isomer occupies a higher energy state than the non-excited nucleus existing in the ground state. In an excited state, one or more of the protons or neutrons in a nucleus occupy a nuclear orbital of higher energy than an available nuclear orbital. These states are analogous to excited states of electrons in atoms.

When excited atomic states decay, energy is released by fluorescence. In electronic transitions, this process usually involves emission of light near the visible range. The amount of energy released is related to bond-dissociation energy or ionization energy and is usually in the range of a few to few tens of eV per bond. However, a much stronger type of binding energy, the nuclear binding energy, is involved in nuclear processes. Due to this, most nuclear excited states decay by gamma ray emission. For example, a well-known nuclear isomer used in various medical procedures is ^{99m}_{43}Tc, which decays with a half-life of about 6 hours by emitting a gamma ray of 140.5 keV energy; this is similar to the energy of medical diagnostic X-rays.

Nuclear isomers have long half-lives because their decay to the ground state is highly "forbidden" from the large change in nuclear spin required. For example, ^{180m}_{73}Ta has a spin of 9 and the lower states have spins 1 and 2. Similarly, ^{99m}_{43}Tc has a spin of 1/2 and the lower states 7/2 and 9/2. Clearly, the latter is less "forbidden" and, as expected, much faster.

Nuclear transitions, including the 'isomeric' variety, occur not only through gamma-ray emission, but also internal conversion where the transition energy instead ejects an electron from the atom, and internal pair production where the transition energy creates an electron-positron pair that are then ejected from the atom. The two processes always compete, with gamma emission normally the most common, but as the proportion converted increases with lower energy and also with forbiddenness, it often becomes important for metastable isomers. In fact, the usual decay of ^{99m}_{43}Tc involves conversion to the spin-7/2 state, then prompt gamma emission to the spin-9/2 ground state; similarly, ^{180m}_{73}Ta could decay through conversion to the spin-2 state, followed by a gamma decay to the ground state. This gamma was looked for in, which assumed that to be the likely decay scheme, and not found.

In isotopes whose ground state is unstable, isomers can decay by the same modes rather than going to the ground state. Often both are seen, but rates can differ so much that only one is. Both isomers discussed just above have unstable ground states: ^{99}_{43}Tc undergoes beta decay, though slowly (half-life 211 ky) due to forbiddenness, and the isomer, which is less so, beta-decays over 10,000 times faster (though still a small minority of decays); ^{180}_{73}Ta can fall to either beta decay or electron capture, and quickly (half-life 8.15 h) as it is not forbidden, there the isomer is much more so to either as well as to isomeric transition, explaining its stability.

=== Forbidden transition ===
There are many reasons why an excited state can be metastable. The most common mechanism is by suppression of gamma decay of excited nuclei, making the decay route a forbidden transition.

Spin is conserved, and a photon has spin 1 ħ. Thus, if a decay route would require a change of ≥ 2 ħ (any possible change is always integer) in angular momentum, then the gamma decay would become highly suppressed. For example, if the decay requires the nucleus to change spin by 2 ħ, then it must emit 2 photons at once. This is a 3-body interaction, which is much weaker than a 2-body interaction, and thus occurs at a much lower rate. In general, each additional unit of spin larger than 1 that the emitted gamma ray must carry inhibits decay rate by about 5 orders of magnitude.

As the excited energy state lowers, eventually internal conversion (IC) and internal pair production (IP) takes over. The decay of ^{180m}Ta from spin-9 state to spin-2 state changes spin by 7 ħ. This suppresses the rate of gamma emission so much that the decay rate is essentially equal to the rate of IC, in agreement with the above.

When the nucleus begins and ends with 0 spin, it cannot decay via single photo gamma emission. The only possible routes are IC, internal pair production, or two-photon gamma emission. Usually IC and IP dominates over two-photon gamma emission.

== Applications ==
Hafnium isomers (mainly ^{178m2}Hf) have been considered as weapons that could be used to circumvent the Nuclear Non-Proliferation Treaty, since it is claimed that they can be induced to emit very strong gamma radiation. This claim is generally discounted. DARPA had a program to investigate this use of both nuclear isomers. The potential to trigger an abrupt release of energy from nuclear isotopes, a prerequisite to their use in such weapons, is disputed. Nonetheless a 12-member Hafnium Isomer Production Panel (HIPP) was created in 2003 to assess means of mass-producing the isotope.

Technetium isomers ^{99m}_{43}Tc (with a half-life of 6.01 hours) and ^{95m}_{43}Tc (with a half-life of 61 days) are used in medical and industrial applications.

=== Nuclear batteries ===
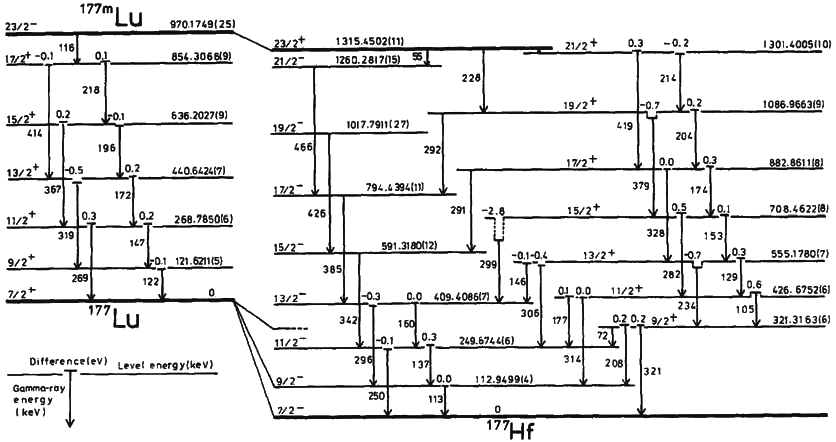
Nuclear decay pathways for the conversion of lutetium-177^{m} to hafnium-177

Nuclear batteries use small amounts (milligrams and microcuries) of radioisotopes with high energy densities. In one betavoltaic device design, radioactive material sits atop a device with adjacent layers of P-type and N-type silicon. Ionizing radiation directly penetrates the junction and creates electron–hole pairs. Nuclear isomers could replace other isotopes, and with further development, it may be possible to turn them on and off by triggering decay as needed. Current candidates for such use include ^{108}Ag, ^{166}Ho, ^{177}Lu, and ^{242}Am. As of 2004, the only successfully triggered isomer was ^{180m}Ta, which required more photon energy to trigger than was released.

An isotope such as ^{177}Lu releases gamma rays by decay through a series of internal energy levels within the nucleus, and it is thought that by learning the triggering cross sections with sufficient accuracy, it may be possible to create energy stores that are 10^{6} times more concentrated than high explosive or other traditional chemical energy storage.
