= Nuclear clock =

Extremely accurate clock in development

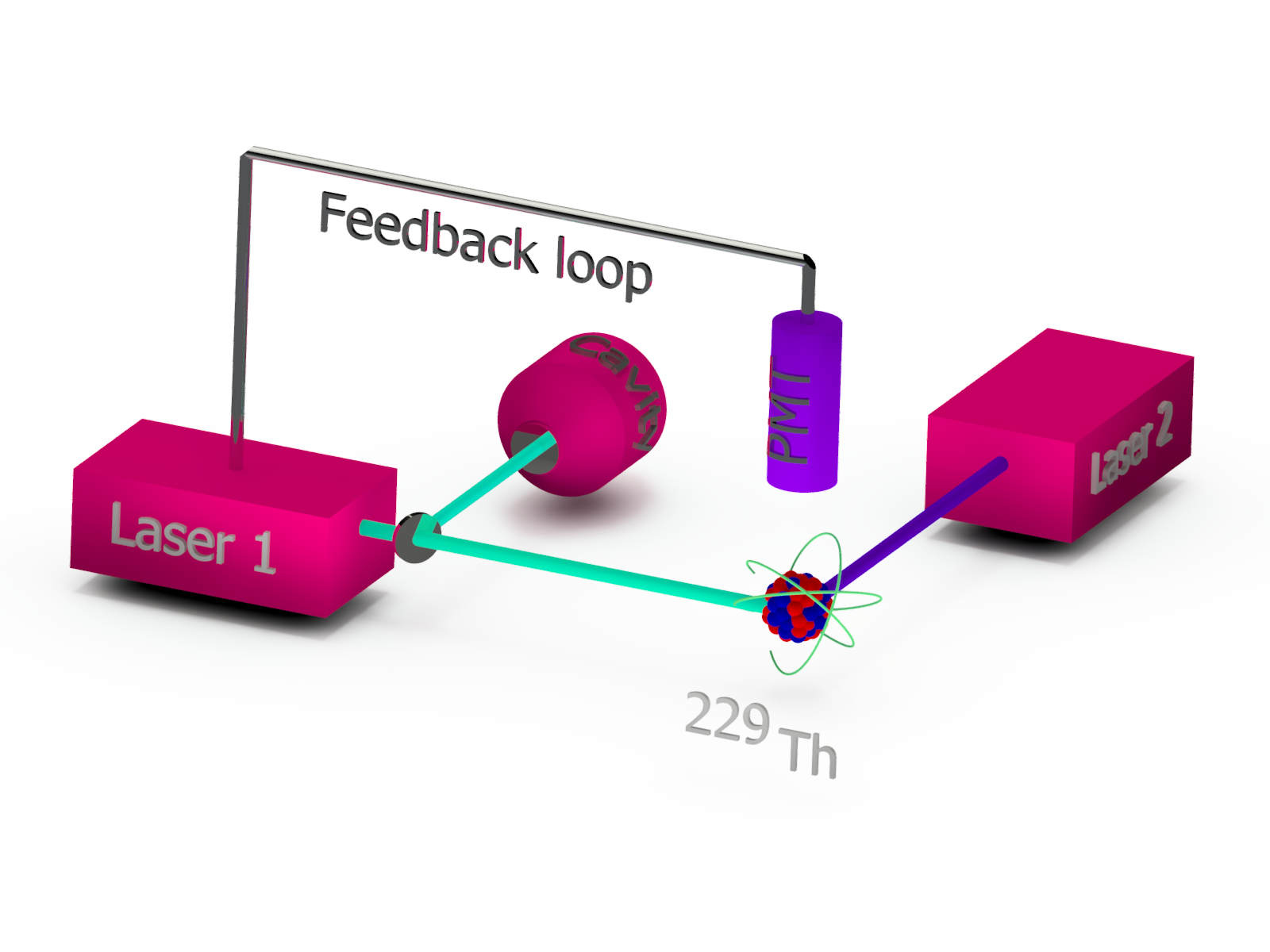
- Concept of a thorium-229 based nuclear optical clock.
- Industry: Scientific, satellite navigation, and data transfer
- Application: Timekeeping

A nuclear clock or nuclear optical clock is an atomic clock which uses photons from a nuclear isomeric transition as its reference frequency, instead of the atomic electron transition energy used by conventional atomic clocks. Such a clock is expected to be more precise than the best current atomic clocks by a factor of about 10, with an achievable precision approaching the 10^{−19} level.

The only nuclear state suitable for the development of a nuclear clock using existing technology is thorium-229m, an isomer of thorium-229 and the lowest-energy nuclear isomer known. With an energy of 8.355733554021(8) eV, this corresponds to a frequency of 2020407384335±2 kHz, or wavelength of 148.382182883 nm, in the vacuum ultraviolet region, making it accessible to laser excitation.

== Principle of operation ==
Atomic clocks are today's most stable timekeeping devices. They operate by exploiting the fact that the gap between the energy levels of two bound electron states in an atom is constant across space and time. A bound electron can be excited with electromagnetic radiation precisely when the radiation's photon energy matches the energy of the transition. Via the Planck relation, that transition energy corresponds to a particular frequency. By irradiating an appropriately prepared collection of identical atoms and measuring the number of excitations induced, a light source's frequency can be tuned to maximize this response and therefore closely match the corresponding electron transition energy. The transition energy thus provides a standard of reference which can be used to calibrate such a source reliably.

Conventional atomic clocks use microwave (high-frequency radio wave) frequencies around 10 GHz, but development of the laser has made it possible to generate very stable light frequencies, and the frequency comb makes it possible to count those oscillations (measured in hundreds of THz, meaning hundred of trillions of cycles per second) to extraordinarily high precision. A device which uses a laser in this way is known as an optical atomic clock.

One prominent example of an optical atomic clock is the ytterbium (Yb) lattice clock, where a particular electron transition in the ytterbium-171 isotope is used for laser stabilization. In this case, experimenters stabilized a laser light to the corresponding electron transition, and found that the laser light at that point has frequency 518295836590863.632±0.088 oscillations per second. Other examples for optical atomic clocks of the highest stability are the Yb-171 single-ion clock, the strontium(Sr)-87 optical lattice clock, and the aluminum(Al)-27 single-ion clock. These clocks achieve stabilities approaching 10^{−18}, corresponding to about 0.4 seconds of drift over the 14-billion-year age of the universe.

A nuclear optical clock uses the same principle of operation, except that the laser is calibrated against a nuclear transition instead of an atomic shell electron transition. The expected advantage of a nuclear clock is that the atomic nucleus is smaller than the atomic shell by up to five orders of magnitude, with correspondingly smaller magnetic dipole and electric quadrupole moments, and is therefore significantly less affected by external magnetic and electric fields. Such external perturbations are the limiting factor for the achieved stability of electron-based atomic clocks. Due to this fundamental advantage, a nuclear optical clock is expected to achieve a time stability approaching 10^{−19}, a ten-fold improvement over electron-based clocks.

=== Ionization ===
An excited atomic nucleus can shed its excess energy by two alternative paths:

- radiatively, by direct photon (gamma ray) emission, or
- by internal conversion, transferring the energy to a shell electron which is ejected from the atom.

For most nuclear isomers, the available energy is sufficient to eject any electron, and the inner-shell electrons are the most frequently ejected. In the special case of ^{229m}Th, the energy is sufficient only to eject an outer electron (thorium's first ionization energy is 6.3 eV), and if the atom is already ionized, there is not enough energy to eject a second (thorium's second ionization energy is 11.5 eV).

The two decay paths have different half-lives. Neutral ^{229m}Th decays almost exclusively by internal conversion, with a half-life of 7±1 μs. In thorium cations, internal conversion is energetically prohibited, and ^{229m}Th^{+} is forced to take the slower path, decaying radiatively with a half-life of around half an hour.

Thus, in the typical case that the clock is designed to measure radiated photons, it is necessary to hold the thorium in an ionized state. This can be done in an ion trap, or by embedding it in an ionic crystal with a band gap greater than the transition energy. In this case, the atoms are not 100% ionized, and a small amount of internal conversion is possible (reducing the half-life to approximately 10 minutes), but the loss is tolerable.

Alternatively, the thorium can be embedded in a material with a bandgap less than the transition energy, and the resonance can be found by measuring the count of ejected electrons as a function of UV excitation wavelength. This method of interrogation has both benefits and disadvantages. The main drawback is that since the decay is much faster, the linewidth is greater, and the stability is limited to "only" about 1 part in 10^{18}. An advantage is that the readout is obtained by measuring ejected electrons, a common lab technique and one that is easy to miniaturize. Readout is also much faster due to the faster decay. Finally, only a very thin surface layer (10 nm) of thorium is required, potentially important as Th-229 is exceedingly rare – the world supply is estimated at 40 grams.

== Different nuclear clock concepts ==
Two different concepts for nuclear optical clocks have been discussed in the literature: trap-based nuclear clocks and solid-state nuclear clocks. As of 2026, only the latter has been constructed.

=== Trap-based nuclear clocks ===
For a trap-based nuclear clock either a single ^{229}Th^{3+} ion is trapped in a Paul trap, known as the single-ion nuclear clock, or a chain of multiple ions is trapped, considered as the multiple-ion nuclear clock. Such clocks are expected to achieve the highest time precision, as the ions are to a large extent isolated from their environment. A multiple-ion nuclear clock could have a significant advantage over the single-ion nuclear clock in terms of stability performance.

=== Solid-state nuclear clocks ===
As the nucleus is largely unaffected by the atomic shell, it is practical to embed many nuclei into a crystal lattice environment. This is known as the crystal-lattice nuclear clock. Due to the high density of embedded nuclei, up to 10^{18} per cm^{3}, this allows irradiating a huge number of nuclei in parallel, thereby drastically increasing the achievable signal-to-noise ratio, but at the cost of potentially higher external perturbations. It has also been proposed to irradiate a metallic ^{229}Th surface and to probe the isomer's excitation in the internal conversion channel, which is known as the internal-conversion nuclear clock. Both types of solid-state nuclear clocks were shown to offer the potential for comparable performance.

== Transition requirements ==
From the principle of operation of a nuclear optical clock, it is evident that direct laser excitation of a nuclear state is a central requirement for the development of such a clock. This is impossible for most nuclear transitions, as the typical energy range of nuclear transitions (keV to MeV) is orders of magnitude above the maximum energy which is accessible with significant intensity by today's narrow-bandwidth laser technology (a few eV). There are only two nuclear excited states known which possess a sufficiently low excitation energy (below 100 eV). These are

- ^{229m}Th, a metastable nuclear excited state of the isotope thorium-229 with an excitation energy of only about 8.4 eV, and
- ^{235m1}U, a metastable excited state of uranium-235 with an energy of 76.7 eV.

However, ^{235m1}U has such an extraordinarily long radiative half-life (on the order of 10^{22} s, 20,000 times the age of the universe, and far longer than its internal conversion half-life of 26 minutes) that it is not practical to use for a clock. This leaves only ^{229m}Th with a realistic chance of direct nuclear laser excitation.

Further requirements for the development of a nuclear clock are that

- the lifetime of the nuclear excited state is relatively long, thereby leading to a resonance of narrow bandwidth (a high quality factor) and
- the ground-state nucleus is easily available and sufficiently stable, to allow one to work with moderate quantities of the material.

Fortunately, ^{229m}Th^{+} has a radiative half-life (time to decay to ^{229}Th^{+}) of around 10^{3} s, and ^{229}Th has a half-life (time to decay to ^{225}Ra) of 7917±48 years,, fulfilling both conditions and making ^{229m}Th^{+} an ideal candidate for the development of a nuclear clock.

== History ==
=== History of nuclear clocks ===
In 1996, Eugene V. Tkalya proposed the use of nuclear excitation as a "highly stable source of light for metrology".

With the development (around 2000) of the frequency comb for measuring optical frequencies exactly, a nuclear optical clock based on ^{229m}Th was first proposed in 2003 by Ekkehard Peik and Christian Tamm, who developed an idea of Uwe Sterr. The paper contains both concepts, the single-ion nuclear clock, as well as the solid-state nuclear clock.

In their pioneering work, Peik and Tamm proposed to use individual laser-cooled ^{229}Th^{3+} ions in a Paul trap to perform nuclear laser spectroscopy. Here the 3+ charge state is advantageous, as it possesses a shell structure suitable for direct laser cooling. It was further proposed to excite an electronic shell state, to achieve 'good' quantum numbers of the total system of the shell plus nucleus that will lead to a reduction of the influence induced by external perturbing fields. A central idea is to probe the successful laser excitation of the nuclear state via the hyperfine-structure shift induced into the electronic shell due to the different nuclear spins of ground- and excited state. This method is known as the double-resonance method.

The expected performance of a single-ion nuclear clock was further investigated in 2012 by Corey Campbell et al. with the result that a systematic frequency uncertainty (precision) of the clock of 1.5×10^{−19} could be achieved, which would be by about an order of magnitude better than the precision achieved by the best optical atomic clocks today. The nuclear clock approach proposed by Campbell et al. slightly differs from the original one proposed by Peik and Tamm. Instead of exciting an electronic shell state in order to obtain the highest insensitivity against external perturbing fields, the nuclear clock proposed by Campbell et al. uses a stretched pair of nuclear hyperfine states in the electronic ground-state configuration, which appears to be advantageous in terms of the achievable quality factor and an improved suppression of the quadratic Zeeman shift.

In 2010, Eugene V. Tkalya showed that it was theoretically possible to use ^{229m}Th as a lasing medium to generate an ultraviolet laser.

The solid-state nuclear clock approach was further developed in 2010 by W.G. Rellergert et al. with the result of an expected long-term precision of about 2×10^{−16}. Although expected to be less precise than the single-ion nuclear clock approach due to line-broadening effects and temperature shifts in the crystal lattice environment, this approach may have advantages in terms of compactness, robustness and power consumption. The expected stability performance was investigated by G. Kazakov et al. in 2012. In 2020, the development of an internal conversion nuclear clock was proposed.

Important steps on the road towards a nuclear clock include the successful direct laser cooling of ^{229}Th^{3+} ions in a Paul trap achieved in 2011, and a first detection of the isomer-induced hyperfine-structure shift, enabling the double-resonance method to probe a successful nuclear excitation in 2018.

=== History of ^{229m}Th ===
Since 1976, the ^{229}Th nucleus has been known to possess a low energy excited state, whose excitation energy was originally shown to less than 100 eV, and then shown to be less than 10 eV in 1990.

This was, however, too broad an energy range to apply high-resolution spectroscopy techniques; the transition energy had to be narrowed down first. Initial efforts used the fact that, after the alpha decay of ^{233}U, the resultant ^{229}Th nucleus is in an excited state and promptly emits a gamma ray to decay to either the base state or the metastable state. Measuring the small difference in the gamma-ray energies emitted in these processes allows the metastable state energy to be found by subtraction. However, nuclear experiments are not capable of finely measuring the difference in frequency between two high gamma-ray energies, so other experiments were needed. Because of the natural radioactive decay of ^{229}Th nuclei, a tightly concentrated laser frequency was required to excite enough nuclei in an experiment to outcompete the background radiation and give a more precise measurement of the excitation energy. Because it was infeasible to scan the entire 100eV range, an estimate of the correct frequency was needed.

An early mis-step was the (incorrect) measurement of the energy value as 3.5±1.0 eV in 1994. This frequency of light is relatively easy to work with, so many direct detection experiments were attempted which had no hope of success because they were built of materials opaque to photons at the true, higher, energy. In particular:

- thorium oxide is transparent to 3.5 eV photons, but opaque at 8.3 eV,
- common optical lens and window materials such as fused quartz are opaque at energies above 8 eV,
- molecular oxygen (air) is opaque to photons above 6.2 eV; experiments must be conducted in a nitrogen or argon atmosphere, and
- the ionization energy of thorium is 6.3 eV so the nuclei will decay by internal conversion unless prevented (see § Ionization).

The energy value remained elusive until 2003, when the nuclear clock proposal triggered a multitude of experimental efforts to pin down the excited state's parameters like energy and half-life. The detection of light emitted in the direct decay of ^{229m}Th would significantly help to determine its energy to higher precision, but all efforts to observe the light emitted in the decay of ^{229m}Th were failing. The energy level was corrected to 7.6±0.5 eV in 2007 (slightly revised to 7.8±0.5 eV in 2009). Subsequent experiments continued to fail to observe any signal of light emitted in the direct decay, leading people to suspect the existence of a strong non-radiative decay channel. The detection of light emitted by the decay of ^{229m}Th was reported in 2012, and again in 2018, but the observed signals were the subject of controversy within the community.

A direct detection of electrons emitted by the isomer's internal conversion decay channel was achieved in 2016. This detection laid the foundation for the determination of the ^{229m}Th half-life in neutral, surface-bound atoms in 2017 and a first laser-spectroscopic characterization in 2018.

In 2019, the isomer's energy was measured via the detection of internal conversion electrons emitted in its direct ground-state decay to 8.28±0.17 eV. Also a first successful excitation of the 29 keV nuclear excited state of ^{229}Th via synchrotron radiation was reported, enabling a clock transition energy measurement of 8.30±0.92 eV. In 2020, an energy of 8.10±0.17 eV was obtained from precision gamma-ray spectroscopy.

Finally, precise measurements were achieved in 2023 by unambiguous detection of the emitted photons (8.338(24) eV) and in April 2024 by two reports of excitation with a tunable laser at 8.355733(10) eV and 8.35574(3) eV. The light frequency is now known with sufficient precision to enable future construction of a prototype clock, and determine the transition's exact frequency and its stability.

Precision frequency measurements began immediately, with Jun Ye's laboratory at JILA making a direct comparison to a ^{87}Sr optical atomic clock. Published in September 2024, the frequency was measured as 2020407384335±2 kHz, a relative uncertainty of 10^{−12}. This implies a wavelength of 148.3821828827(15) nm and an energy of 8.355733554021(8) eV. The work also resolved different nuclear quadrupole sublevels and measured the ratio of the ground and excited state nuclear quadrupole moment. Improvements will surely follow.

=== The first nuclear clocks ===
With the prerequisite research complete, attention shifted to the technical details of constructing a nuclear clock. The temperature sensitivity of solid-state nuclear clocks was studied, and it was found that one transition has a frequency minimum at 195±5 K. Since the first derivative vanishes at this point, this reduces the required temperature stability of a practical clock.

The first two prototype nuclear clocks were announced in June 2026. Both use solid-state crystals of CaF_{2} doped with^{229}Th. Their performance is so far similar to more mature atomic clock technologies (stability for intervals $\tau$ up to 10,000 seconds about $3\cdot 10^{-12} \sqrt{\text{s}/\tau}$, better than $4\cdot 10^{-12} \sqrt{\text{s}/\tau}$ for an HP 5071A/001 caesium atomic clock, but far worse than $1.55\cdot 10^{-13} \sqrt{\text{s}/\tau}$ for a caesium fountain), and development is expected to be rapid.

== Applications ==
Solid-state nuclear clocks have the potential to make optical atomic clock performance available to applications which are currently precluded by the bulky atomic trapping systems, such as satellite-based navigation. The high performance of nuclear optical clocks will allow new applications inaccessible to other atomic clocks, such as relativistic geodesy, the search for topological dark matter, and the determination of time variations of fundamental constants.

A nuclear clock has the potential to be particularly sensitive to possible time variations of the fine-structure constant. The central idea is that the low transition energy is due to a fortuitous cancellation between strong nuclear and electromagnetic effects within the nucleus, which are individually much stronger. Any variation of the fine-structure constant would affect the electromagnetic half of this balance, resulting in a proportionally very large change in the total transition energy. A change of even one part in 10^{18} could be detected by comparison with a conventional atomic clock (whose frequency would also be altered, but not nearly as much), so this measurement would be extraordinarily sensitive to any potential variation of the constant. Recent measurements and analysis are consistent with enhancement factors on the order of 10^{4}.
