= Vitaly Ginzburg =

Russian physicist (1916–2009)

- Виталий Гинзбург
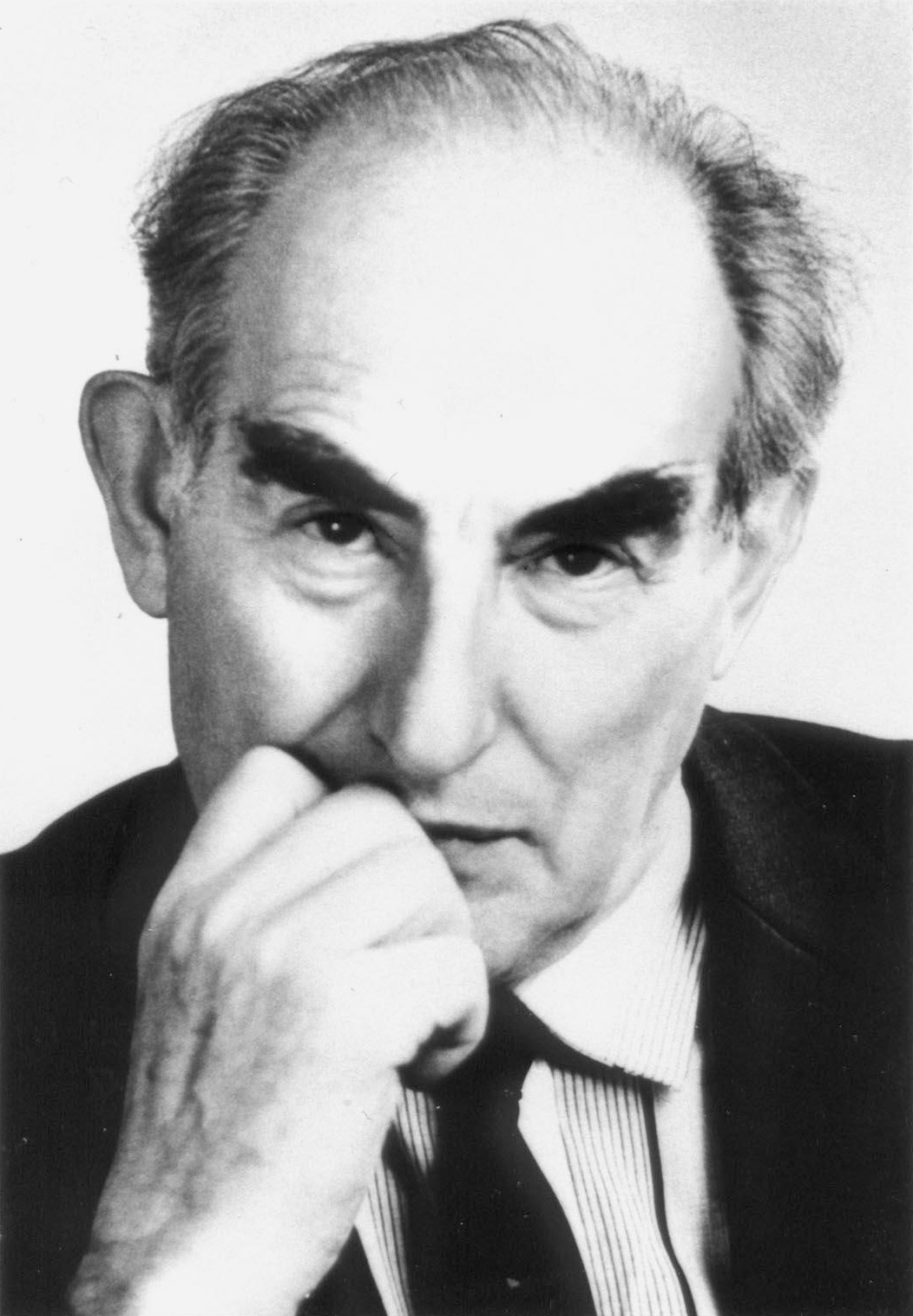
- Born: Vitaly Lazarevich Ginzburg; 4 October 1916; Moscow, Russian Empire
- Died: 8 November 2009 (aged 93); Moscow, Russia
- Resting place: Novodevichy Cemetery, Moscow
- Education: Moscow State University (KN 1938) (DN 1942)
- Known for: Ginzburg–Landau theory Ginzburg criterion Transition radiation Undulator
- Spouse(s): Olga Zamsha Ginzburg (1937–1946; divorced; 1 child) Nina Yermakova Ginzburg (m. 1946)
- Awards: Nobel Prize in Physics (2003); Wolf Prize in Physics (1994/95); Lomonosov Gold Medal (1995); ForMemRS (1987)
- Scientific career
- Fields: Theoretical physics
- Workplaces: P. N. Lebedev Physical Institute, Russian Academy of Sciences; N. I. Lobachevsky State University of Nizhny Novgorod
- Doctoral advisor: Igor Tamm
- Doctoral students: Viatcheslav Mukhanov; Leonid Keldysh

Vitaly Lazarevich Ginzburg ForMemRS (Russian: Вита́лий Ла́заревич Ги́нзбург; 4 October [O.S. 21 September] 1916 – 8 November 2009) was a Russian physicist who was honored with the Nobel Prize in Physics in 2003, together with Alexei Abrikosov and Anthony Leggett for their "pioneering contributions to the theory of superconductors and superfluids."

He spent his career in the former Soviet Union and was one of the leading figure in former Soviet program of nuclear weapons, working towards designs of the thermonuclear devices. He became a member of the Russian Academy of Sciences and succeeded Igor Tamm as head of the Department of Theoretical Physics of the Lebedev Physical Institute of the Russian Academy of Sciences (FIAN). After the fall of the Soviet-Union Ginzburg presented himself as an atheist and became an outspoken critic of the Russian Orthodox clergy's influence in Russian society. Yet simultaneously, he publicly identified as an agnostic Jew, served on the board of directors of the Russian Jewish Congress, vocally fought what he considered anti-semitism in Russian society and was a very active supporter and fundraiser for Israel and Zionist causes.

== Biography ==
Vitaly Ginzburg was born to a Jewish family in Moscow on 4 October 1916— the son of an engineer, Lazar Yefimovich Ginzburg, and a doctor, Augusta Wildauer who was a graduate from the Physics Faculty of Moscow State University in 1938. After attending his mother's alma mater, he defended his qualifications of the candidate's (Kandidat Nauk) dissertation in 1940, and his comprehensive thesis for the doctor's (Doktor Nauk) qualification in 1942. In 1944, he became a member of the Communist Party of the Soviet Union. Among his achievements are a partially phenomenological theory of superconductivity, the Ginzburg–Landau theory, developed with Lev Landau in 1950; the theory of electromagnetic wave propagation in plasmas (for example, in the ionosphere); and a theory of the origin of cosmic radiation. He is also known to biologists as being part of the group of scientists that helped bring down the reign of the politically connected anti-Mendelian agronomist Trofim Lysenko, thus allowing modern genetic science to return to the USSR.

In 1937, Ginzburg married Olga Zamsha. In 1946, he married his second wife, Nina Ginzburg (nee Yermakova), who had spent more than a year in custody on fabricated charges of plotting to assassinate the Soviet leader Joseph Stalin.

As a renowned professor and researcher, Ginzburg was an obvious candidate for the Soviet bomb project. From 1948 through 1952 Ginzburg worked under Igor Kurchatov to help with the hydrogen bomb. Ginzburg and Igor Tamm both proposed ideas that would make it possible to build a hydrogen bomb. When the bomb project moved to Arzamas-16 to continue in even more secrecy, Ginzburg was not allowed to follow. Instead he stayed in Moscow and supported from afar, staying under watch due to his background and past. As the work got continuously more classified, Ginzburg was phased out of the project and allowed to pursue his true passion, superconductors. During the Cold War, the thirst for knowledge and technological advancement was never-ending. This was no different with the research done on superconductors. The Soviet Union believed that the research done on superconductors would place them ahead of their American counterparts. Both sides sought to leverage the potential military applications of superconductors.

Ginzburg was the editor-in-chief of the scientific journal Uspekhi Fizicheskikh Nauk. He also headed the Academic Department of Astrophysics Problems, which Ginzburg founded at the Moscow Institute of Physics and Technology in 1968.

Ginzburg identified as a secular Jew, and following the collapse of communism in the former Soviet Union, he was very active in Jewish life, especially in Russia, where he served on the board of directors of the Russian Jewish Congress. He is also well known for fighting anti-Semitism and supporting the state of Israel.

In the 2000s (decade), Ginzburg was politically active, supporting the Russian liberal opposition and human rights movement. He defended Igor Sutyagin and Valentin Danilov against charges of espionage put forth by the authorities. On 2 April 2009, in an interview to the Radio Liberty Ginzburg denounced the FSB as an institution harmful to Russia and the ongoing expansion of its authority as a return to Stalinism.

Ginzburg worked at the P. N. Lebedev Physical Institute of Soviet and Russian Academy of Sciences in Moscow since 1940. Russian Academy of Sciences is a major institution where mostly all Nobel Prize laureates of physics from Russia have done their studies and/or research works.

== Stance on religion ==
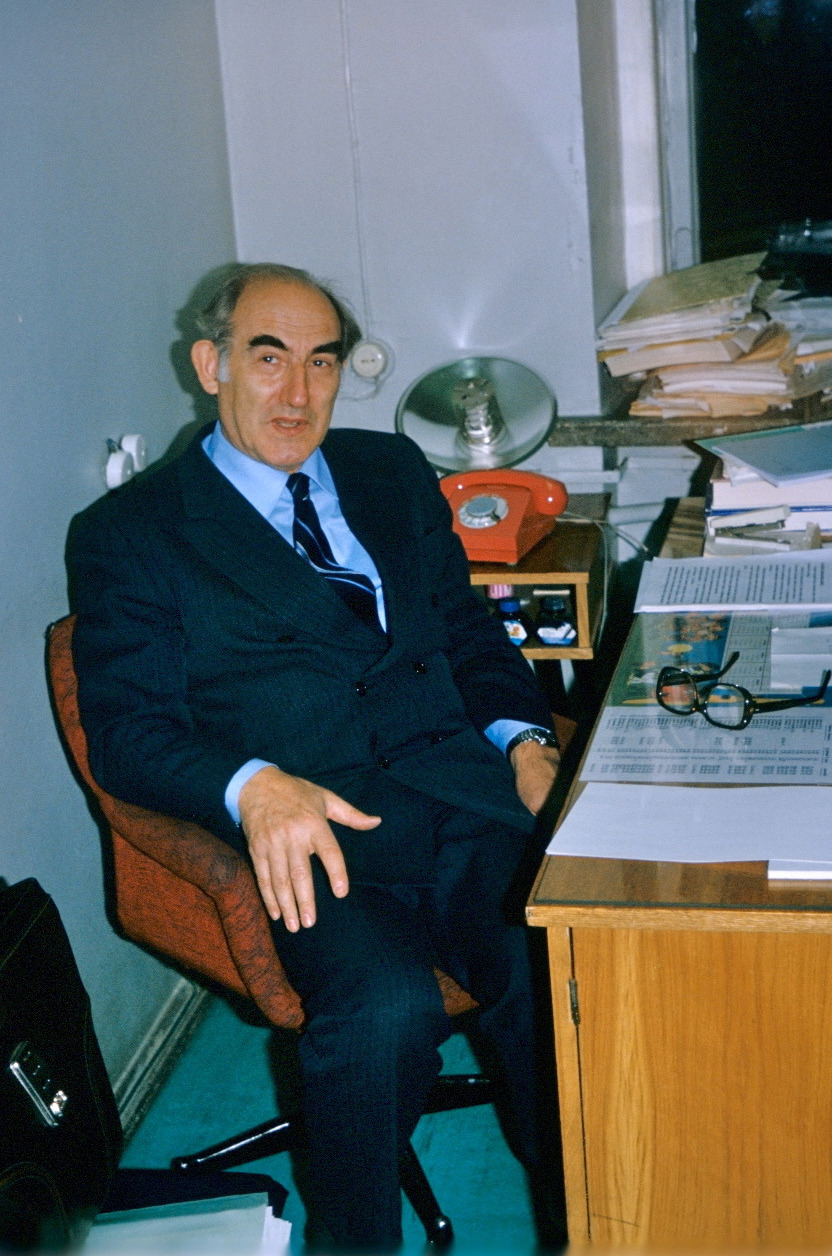
Ginzburg, Moscow, December 1980.

Ginzburg was an avowed atheist, both under the primarily atheist Soviet government and in post-Communist Russia when religion made a strong revival. He criticized clericalism in the press and wrote several books devoted to the questions of religion and atheism. Because of this, some Orthodox Christian groups denounced him and said no science award could excuse his verbal attacks on the Russian Orthodox Church. He was one of the signers of the Open letter to the President Vladimir V. Putin from the Members of the Russian Academy of Sciences against clericalisation of Russia.

== Nobel Prize ==
Vitaly Ginzburg, along with Anthony Leggett and Alexei Abrikosov were awarded the Nobel Prize in Physics in 2003 for their groundbreaking work on the theory of superconductors. The Nobel Prize recognized Ginzburg's work in theoretical physics, specifically his contributions to understanding the behavior of matter at extremely low temperatures.

His collaboration with Lev Landau in 1950 led to the development of the Ginzburg-Landau theory, which became paramount to later work on superconductors. Landau had been working on superconductors for years before their partnership, with Landau publishing many papers between 1941 and 1947 on the properties of quantum fluids at extremely low temperatures. Lev Landau would later receive a Nobel Prize in 1962 for this research on the properties of the superfluid liquid helium in 1941. Before their collaboration, Landau had just done research on liquid helium and other quantum fluids, but Ginzburg allowed them to go a step further.

Ginzburg introduced the concept of an order parameter, which would allow them to characterize the state of the superconductor. To do this, they derived a complex set of equations that would allow them to describe the behavior of the superconductor. These equations provided a model from which researchers can understand the transition between a normal and superconducting state, as well as be able to predict various properties of other superconductors. Using these equations, they were also able to introduce the Ginzburg–Landau parameter. This parameter used a separate set of equations in order to classify if they were looking at a type-I or type-II superconductor. This advancement allowed Anthony Leggett to build upon it and complete his own research on superconductors.

Applications of his research findings include MRI machines, engines, and new Maglev trains.

== Death ==
A spokeswoman for the Russian Academy of Sciences announced that Ginzburg died in Moscow on 8 November 2009 from cardiac arrest. He had been suffering from ill health for several years, and three years before his death said "In general, I envy believers. I am 90, and [am] being overcome by illnesses. For believers, it is easier to deal with them and with life's other hardships. But what can be done? I cannot believe in resurrection after death."

Prime Minister of Russia Vladimir Putin sent his condolences to Ginzburg's family, saying "We bid farewell to an extraordinary personality whose outstanding talent, exceptional strength of character and firmness of convictions evoked true respect from his colleagues". President of Russia Dmitry Medvedev, in his letter of condolences, described Ginzburg as a "top physicist of our time whose discoveries had a huge impact on the development of national and world science."

Ginzburg was buried on 11 November in the Novodevichy Cemetery in Moscow, the resting place of many famous politicians, writers and scientists of Russia.

== Ginzburg's list ==
Over the years, Ginzburg compiled a list of unsolved problems in physics. In 1971 the list included 17 problems, and 20 problems in 1985. In 1999, he published his list of 30 problems for the 21st century. During his 2003 Nobel lecture he presented the list, and was finally published in his About Science, Myself and Others in 2005. Physicist Ivan Bozovic who knew the Ginzburg family referred to it as "The Ginzburg's list". The list includes:

1. Controlled nuclear fusion.
2. High-temperature and room-temperature superconductivity.
3. Metallic hydrogen. Other exotic substances.
4. Two-dimensional electron liquid (the anomalous Hall effect and other effects).
5. Some questions of solid-state physics (heterostructures in semiconductors, quantum wells and dots, metal-dielectric transitions, charge- and spin-density waves, mesoscopics).
6. Second-order and related phase transitions. Some examples of such transitions. Cooling (in particular, laser cooling) to superlow temperatures. Bose-Einstein condensation in gases.
7. Surface physics. Clusters.
8. Liquid crystals. Ferroelectrics. Ferrotoroics.
9. Fullerenes. Nanotubes.
10. The behavior of matter in superstrong magnetic fields.
11. Nonlinear physics. Turbulence. Solitons. Chaos. Strange attractors.
12. X-ray lasers, gamma-ray lasers, superhigh-power lasers.
13. Superheavy elements. Exotic nuclei.
14. Mass spectrum. Quarks and gluons. Quantum chromodynamics. Quark-gluon plasma.
15. Unified theory of weak and electromagnetic interactions. W and Z bosons. Leptons.
16. Standard Model. Grand unification. Superunification. Proton decay. Neutrino mass. Magnetic monopoles.
17. Fundamental length. Particle interaction at high and superhigh energies. Colliders.
18. Nonconservation of CP invariance.
19. Nonlinear phenomena in vacuum and in superstrong magnetic fields. Phase transitions in a vacuum.
20. Strings. M-theory.
21. Experimental verification of the general theory of relativity.
22. Gravitational waves and their detection.
23. The cosmological problem. Inflation. The Λ term and “quintessence.” Relationship between cosmology and high-energy physics.
24. Neutron stars and pulsars. Supernova stars.
25. Black holes. Cosmic strings.
26. Quasars and galactic nuclei. Formation of galaxies.
27. The problem of dark matter (hidden mass) and its detection.
28. The origin of superhigh-energy cosmic rays.
29. Gamma-ray bursts. Hypernovae.
30. Neutrino physics and astronomy. Neutrino oscillations.

Alongside the list he also discussed three "great problems":

1. The increase in entropy, time irreversibility, and the “time arrow.”
2. The problem of interpretation of nonrelativistic quantum mechanics and the possibility of learning something new even in the field of its applicability.
3. The question of the emergence of life, i.e., the feasibility of explaining the origin of life and thought on the basis of physics alone.

== Family ==
The first wife (in 1937–1946) is a graduate of the Faculty of Physics of Moscow State University (1938) Olga Ivanovna Zamsha (born 1915, Yeysk), candidate of physical and mathematical sciences (1945), associate professor at MEPhI (1949–1985), author of the "Collection of problems on general physics" (with co-authors, 1968, 1972, 1975). The second wife (since 1946) is a graduate of the Faculty of Mechanics and Mathematics of Moscow State University, experimental physicist Nina Ivanovna Ginzburg (née Ermakova) (October 2, 1922 — May 19, 2019).

== Other honors and awards ==
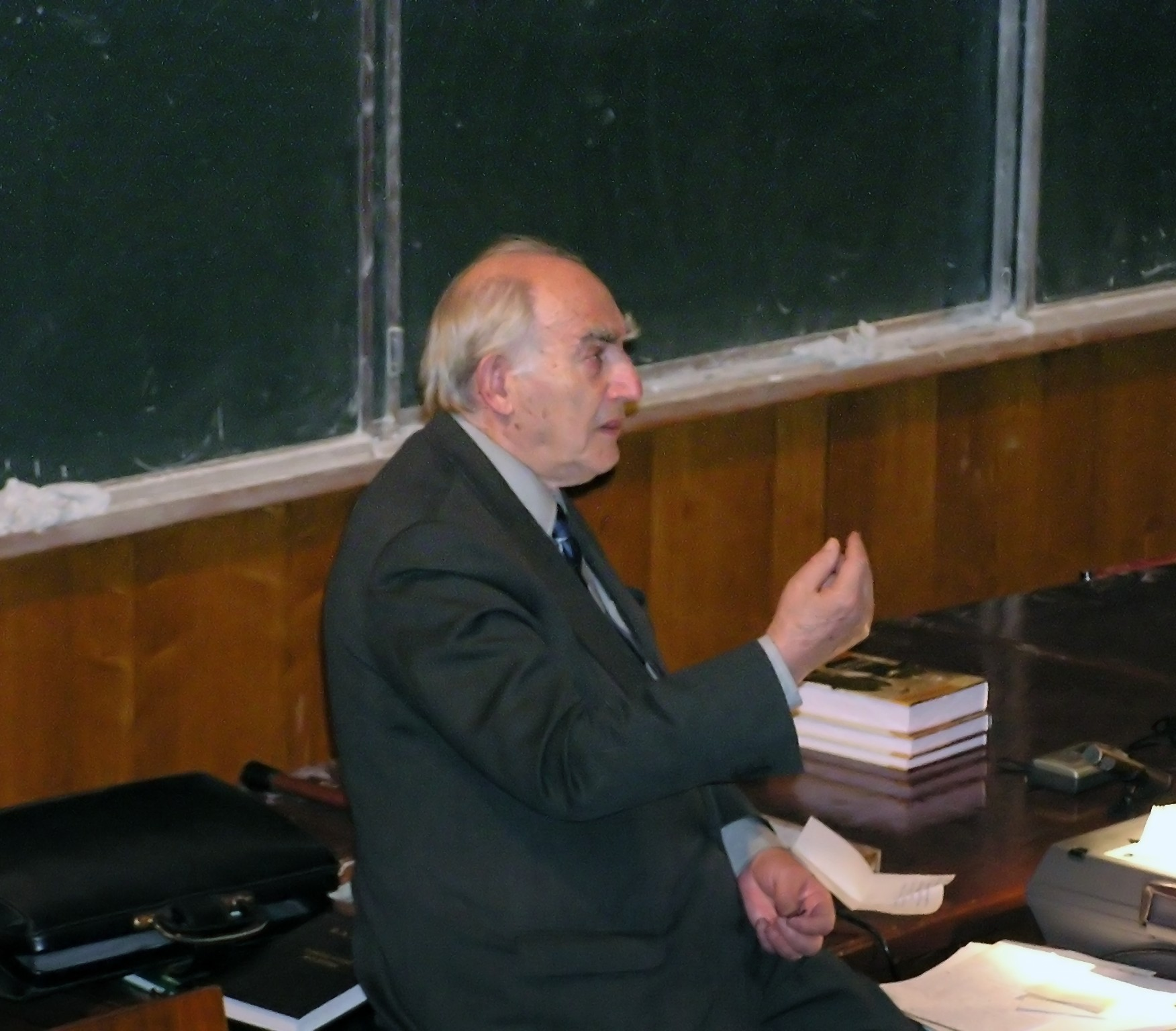
Ginzburg reads a Nobel lecture in Moscow State University.

- Medal "For Valiant Labour in the Great Patriotic War 1941–1945" (1946)
- Medal "In Commemoration of the 800th Anniversary of Moscow" (1948)
- Stalin Prize in 1953
- Order of Lenin (1954)
- Order of the Badge of Honour, twice (1954, 1975)
- Order of the Red Banner of Labour, twice (1956, 1986)
- Lenin Prize in 1966
- Medal "For Valiant Labour. To commemorate the 100th anniversary of the birth of Vladimir Ilyich Lenin" (1970)
- Marian Smoluchowski Medal (1984)
- Elected a Foreign Member of the Royal Society (ForMemRS) in 1987
- Gold Medal of the Royal Astronomical Society in 1991
- Wolf Prize in Physics in 1994/5
- Vavilov Gold Medal (1995) – for outstanding work in physics, including a series of papers on the theory of radiation by uniformly moving sources
- Lomonosov Gold Medal in 1995 – for outstanding achievement in the field of theoretical physics and astrophysics
  - 3rd class (3 October 1996) – for outstanding scientific achievements and the training of highly qualified personnel
- Elected a Fellow of the American Physical Society in 2003.
- Ó Ceallaigh Medal by the IUPAP Cosmic Ray Commission for contributions to cosmic ray physics.
- Order "For Merit to the Fatherland", 1st class (4 October 2006) – for outstanding contribution to the development of national science and many years of fruitful activity

== See also ==
- List of Jewish Nobel laureates
