= Lev Barkov =

- Born: Lev Mitrofanovich Barkov; October 24, 1928; Moscow, RSFSR, Soviet Union
- Died: February 9, 2013 (aged 84); Novosibirsk, Russian Federation
- Education: Lomonosov Moscow State University
- Awards: 1989 USSR State Prize
- Scientific career
- Fields: physics
- Workplaces: Budker Institute of Nuclear Physics; Novosibirsk State University; Kurchatov Institute of Atomic Energy

Lev Mitrofanovich Barkov (Russian: Лев Митрофанович Барков; October 24, 1928, in Moscow – February 9, 2013, in Novosibirsk) was a Russian physicist, Academician of the Academy of Sciences of the USSR (since 1984), Professor at the Novosibirsk State University (since 1973) and Laureate of the 1989 USSR State Prize.

He graduated from the Lomonosov Moscow State University in 1952 with a dissertation on classified neutron research, continued from then at the Kurchatov Institute of Atomic Energy. A few years later, the Kurchatov Institute sent Barkov as part of the Soviet delegation to the 1955 UN conference in Geneva on "Peaceful Uses of Atomic Energy".

Since 1967 he worked at the Budker Institute of Nuclear Physics within the Siberian Division of the Russian Academy of Sciences (Russian: Сибирское отделение Российской академии наук CO PAN) in Novosibirsk, Russia.

He taught at the Novosibirsk State University since 1967, as a professor since 1973, and he was also a department chair.

From 1976 to 1979, Barkov served as the Dean of the Faculty of Physics of the Novosibirsk State University.

He was awarded:

- Order of the October Revolution (1971)
- Order of the Badge of Honour (1975)
- Order of the Red Banner of Labour (1982)
- USSR State Prize (1989)
- Order "For Merit to the Fatherland", 4th class (1998)
