= Montreal Declaration on Animal Exploitation =

Academic statement

The Montreal Declaration on Animal Exploitation is a manifesto published on October 4, 2022, in which more than 500 scholars and academics specialising in moral and political philosophy declare their support for the idea that an end to all forms of animal husbandry, fishing and exploitation in general is the only collective horizon that is both realistic and fair.

== Context ==
This declaration refers both in its title and explicitly in its text to the Cambridge Declaration on Consciousness, released in 2012, establishing the presence in mammals, birds and many other animals of the necessary substrates for consciousness as well as the ability to exhibit intensional behaviour. This initial declaration also inspired a previous response in the field of law in 2019, the Toulon Declaration, defending the legal personality of animals. For columnist and philosophy teacher Sébastien Lévesque, this statement also echoes the Animal Welfare and Safety Act, passed in 2015 by the Quebec National Assembly, stipulating that animals are not property but rather "sentient beings".

This declaration is the initiative of Martin Gibert, Valéry Giroux and François Jaquet, three researchers from the Groupe de Recherche en Éthique Environnementale et Animale (GRÉEA), affiliated with the Centre de Recherche en Éthique (CRÉ), in Montreal. It is published on October 4, 2022 on the occasion of World Animal Day.

== Content of the declaration ==
The signatories emphasise in the preamble that they come from different philosophical traditions and rarely agree with each other. However, they are united in their condemnation of "the practices that involve treating animals as objects or commodities" and the need to transform our relationship with other animals by ending their exploitation. They base their argument on the well-established ethological fact that most exploited animals are sentient, i.e. capable of subjectively feeling pleasant or unpleasant things. They then briefly explain the logical reasoning behind the rejection of speciesism, understood as discrimination that arbitrarily favors the interests of humans over those of other animals.

In favour of closing down slaughterhouses, ending fishing and developing plant-based agriculture, the signatories lucidly admit that, even if it constitutes "the only shared horizon that is both realistic and just", such a project will require "renouncing entrenched speciesist habits and transforming numerous institutions fundamentally".

Initially announced as being signed by 400 academics including some big names such as Peter Singer, Peter Unger, Renan Larue, Carol Adams and Jocelyn Maclure, by the end of October the declaration had nearly 550 signatories from around 40 countries.

== Reactions ==
The text was published in full in national newspapers in France, Canada, Turkey and Spain.

It has also been summarised and commented in many countries and received an enthusiastic response from animal rights groups.

=== Positive reactions ===
Anne Crignon, a journalist with French newspaper Nouvel Obs, celebrated "the marriage of intellectual excellence and asserted stand" of signatories.

Various national media outlets, animal rights groups and historian and lecturer of the anti-speciesist movement Jérôme Segal saw this declaration as a turning point in the recognition of the philosophy's support for non-human animals. Journalist Axelle Playoust-Braure notes that this is one of the few consensuses in ethics.

Brazilian online newspaper Fato Amazônico highlighted the fact that this position, once held by a few people who were particularly sensitive to the fate of animals, was for the first time supported by hundreds of researchers who had dedicated their careers to ethical reflection. For philosopher Annalisa Di Mauro, it was a "snapshot of the current situation in which there is a broad consensus among scientists and professionals on an issue that is now on the agenda of our societies, of our civilisation".

=== Criticism ===
On the other hand, the tribune of moral philosophers also provoked antagonistic reactions, even within their own camp. French journalist Paul Sugy, author of L'extinction de l'homme Le projet fou des antispécistes (The Extinction of Humankind, the Crazy Project of the Antispeciesists), mainly criticised the lack of neutrality of the signatories, many of whom are known to favour animal rights. With a more alarmist tone, the specialised quarterly Jours de Chasse (Hunting Days) saw in this broad consensus between researchers and university professors the premise of tomorrow's political and legal decisions, notably through the transmission of knowledge to students trained by them.

Confédération paysanne, a French farmers' union that defends family farming, responded in French daily Le Monde by denouncing an "anti-humanist" project and a "manichean posture" that was missing the mark of "the industrialisation of life". They defended peasant farming as a middle ground. Author and artisan farmer Dominic Lamontagne agrees with this reformist idea, arguing that certain relationships with farm animals can be mutually beneficial.

On the other hand, lawyer and vegan philosopher Gary Francione deplored the fact that this consensus text did not explicitly condemn any use of animals and did not recognise their moral and legal personality. On the contrary, in an interview with Paris Match, philosopher Mark Hunyadi, who signed the text, announced that despite an agreement on the aim of the text, he rejected the idea that animals could have interests that could make them legal subjects. In agreement with philosopher Réjéan Bergeron, reacting to the declaration in a post in Canadian newspaper Métro, he doubted the effectiveness of calling for such profound changes and opted for a more reformist strategy. In the journal Between the Species, philosopher Julian Friedland argues that the language of the declaration represents an anthropomoralist projection of personhood qualities (namely, those of self-consciousness extending into the future) onto beings that are merely sentient non-persons without such capacities. He rejects for instance that fetal pain is equally morally considerable to that of a gestating person.
