= Donald Milton =

American aerobiology researcher

Donald K Milton MD, DrPH
- Education: University of Maryland, Baltimore County; Harvard School of Public Health; Johns Hopkins University School of Medicine
- Known for: Research on airborne transmission of respiratory viruses
- Scientific career
- Fields: Aerobiology; Environmental health; Public health
- Institutions: University of Maryland
- Thesis: Airborne endotoxin: Measurement and toxicity (1989)

Donald K. Milton is a professor of Environmental and Occupational Health in the University of Maryland School of Public Health, Department of Global, Environmental, and Occupational Health. He also holds a secondary appointment in the Department of Medicine at the University of Maryland School of Medicine. He is known for his research in the field of aerobiology and his pioneering work on the airborne transmission of respiratory viruses such as SARS-CoV-2. As a consultant to the World Health Organization he participated in developing the Global technical consultation report on proposed terminology for pathogens that transmit through the air. He currently serves on the World Health Organization Infection Prevention and Control of Epidemic- and Pandemic-prone Acute Respiratory Infections Guideline Development Group
