= Open letter =

Letter intended for a wide audience

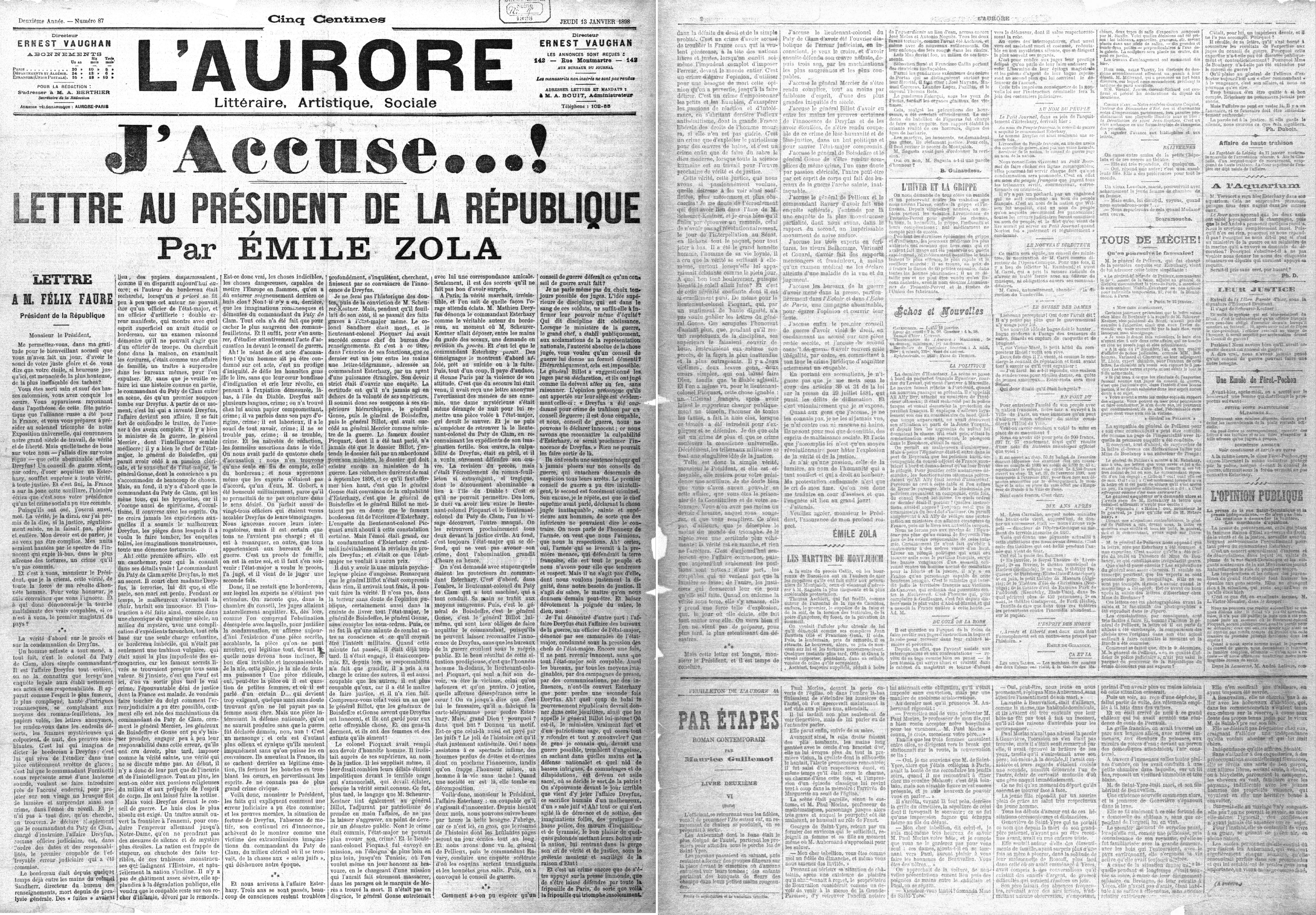
J'Accuse…! is an influential open letter written by Émile Zola in 1898 over the Dreyfus Affair.

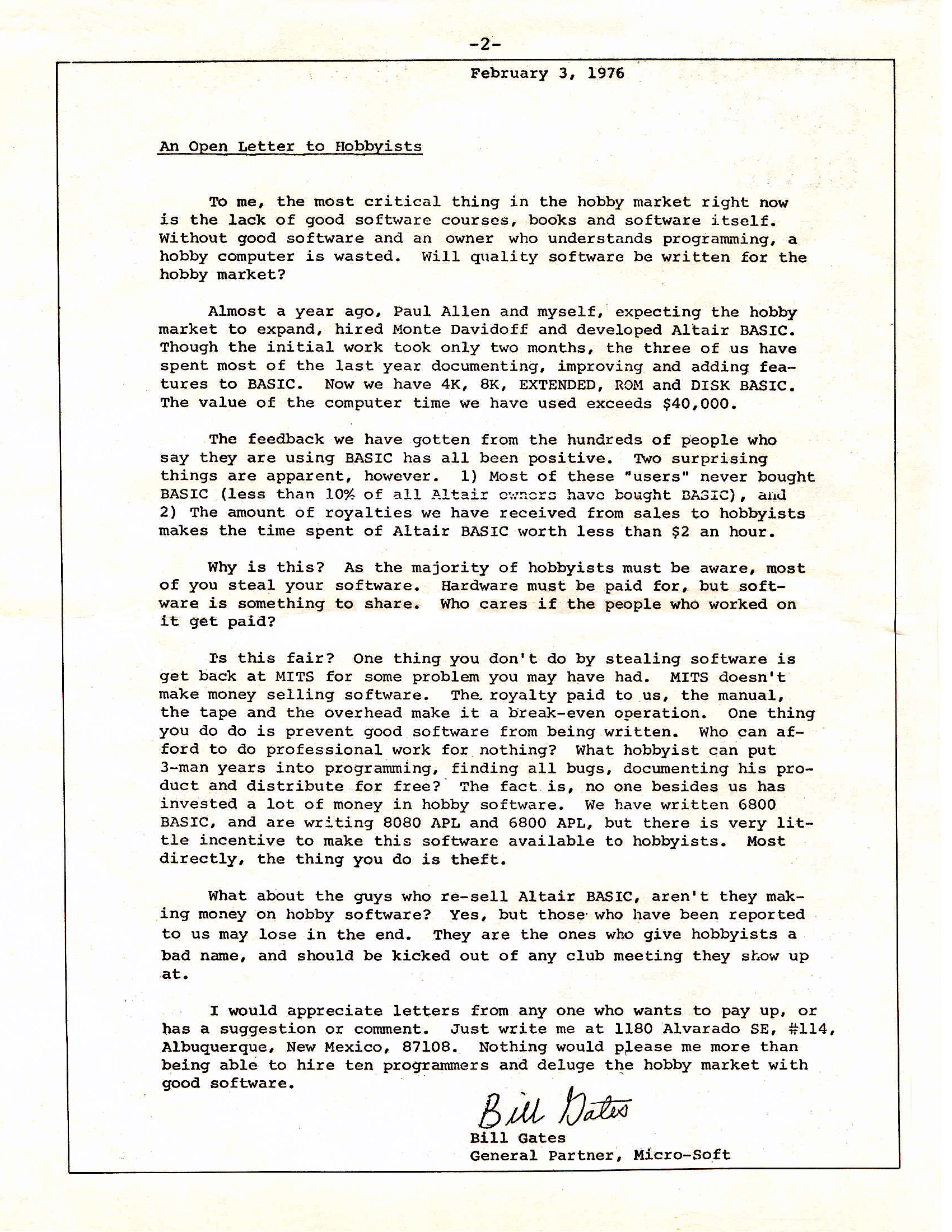
Bill Gates's Open Letter to Hobbyists from the Homebrew Computer Club Newsletter, January 1976

An open letter is a letter that is intended to be read by a wide audience, or a letter intended for an individual, but that is nonetheless widely distributed intentionally.

Open letters usually take the form of a letter addressed to an individual but are provided to the public through newspapers and other media, such as a letter to the editor or blog. Critical open letters addressed to political leaders are especially common.

Two of the most famous and influential open letters are J'accuse...! by Émile Zola to the president of France, accusing the French government of wrongfully convicting Alfred Dreyfus for alleged espionage; and Martin Luther King Jr.'s 1963 "Letter from Birmingham Jail", including the famous quotation "Injustice anywhere is a threat to justice everywhere".

== Context ==
In previous centuries, letter writing was a significant form of communication. Letters were normally kept private between the sender and recipient. Consequently, an open letter, usually published in a newspaper or magazine, was a then-rare opportunity for the general public to see what a public figure was saying to another public figure. Open letters, published in newspapers, became more common in the late 19th century.

In the 21st century, documents labeled open letters are common and similar to press releases, with large volumes of open letters being sent automatically to large volumes of newspapers and other publications. In other cases, blog posts and posts on social media are considered open letters. Another shift in the 21st century is the increasing prevalence of open letters with many signatories (similar to an online petition).

When academic scientists publish open letters about science, they may use some of the same features that they use in academic writing, such as seeking informal peer review before publication or believing that the act of communicating itself is a meritorious scholarly activity.

== Motivations for writing ==
There are a number of reasons why an individual would choose the form of an open letter, including the following reasons:

- To publicly criticize something
- To make a power play in shaping public opinion on an issue or framing a dispute
- To state the author's opinion
- As an attempt to start, or to end, a wider dialogue around an issue
- As an attempt to focus broad attention on the letter's recipient, prompting them to some action
- As part of public relations crisis communication or organizational reputation management
- For humor value
- To make public a communication that must take place as a letter for reasons of formality

== Problems ==
Eric Kaufmann characterizes the authoring of open letters in academia calling for the dismissal of academics as a form of "hard authoritarianism" accompanying political correctness and cancel culture. Others associate open letters with bullying, divisiveness, safetyism (suppressing ideas to ensure a reader's immediate emotional comfort), and a culture of complaining. Online open letters have some qualities in common with gossip, including the impossibility of un-saying what has been disseminated, and its use by marginalized groups to complain about perceived opression.

Open letters tend not to win hearts and minds, especially if there is a limited connection between the writers, the subject, and the nominal addressee. A close connection, such as university faculty writing to the university president about their hopes and goals for university students, is more likely to be effective at influencing a decision than an absent or distant connection, such as students writing to the internet at large about the students' beliefs about a political situation in a country that most of the students have never visited.

Signatories may feel pressured to sign an open letter written by someone else instead of writing their own. Even if the letter is badly written or does not fully or accurately reflect each signer's own views, to refuse to endorse it may be taken as complete disagreement with the general concept. In other cases, the signer may not fully understand the contents.

== Examples ==
- "Yorkshire Slavery" by abolitionist Richard Oastler in 1830, about exploitative child labor practices in English textile mills
- "Jerilderie Letter" by Australian bushranger and outlaw Ned Kelly in 1879, a public declaration defending his actions and condemning police corruption, British rule, and the mistreatment of Irish Australians and the rural poor
- J'accuse...! by journalist Émile Zola in 1898, about the Dreyfus affair in France
- "Letter from Birmingham Jail" by civil rights leader Martin Luther King Jr. in 1963, about racism and civil rights
- Letter to The Times, signed by 364 economists in 1981, urging then-Chancellor Geoffrey Howe to adopt a different economic policy (he refused)
- "Stop Coddling the Super Rich" by billionaire Warren Buffett in 2011, which encouraged US politicians to tax wealthy people more

== See also ==
- Epistolary poem
- List of open letters by academics
- Persuasive writing
- Polemic
- White paper
