= Particle-induced gamma emission =

Particle-induced gamma-ray emission (PIGE) spectroscopy is a form of nuclear reaction analysis, one of the ion beam analysis thin-film analytical techniques.

== Methodology & usage ==
Typically, an MeV proton beam is directed onto a sample which may be tens of microns thick, and the fast protons may excite the target nuclei such that gamma rays are emitted. These may be used to characterize the sample. For example, sodium in glass is of great importance but can be hard to measure non destructively: X-ray fluorescence (XRF) and particle-induced X-ray emission (PIXE) are both sensitive only to the surface few microns of the sample because of the low energy (and consequent high absorption coefficient) of the Na K X-rays (1.05 keV). But, for example, the ^{23}Na(p,p'γ)^{23}Na reaction has a high and relatively well-known cross-section (see the IAEA "IBANDL" site) and is therefore frequently used for determining bulk sodium content of glasses, since the gamma energy (440 keV) is so high that there is effectively no absorption. The IAEA has sponsored the development of a database of PIGE cross-sections.

An example of a PIGE spectrum. The lines at 0.429 MeV and 0.478 MeV are for gamma rays that represent lithium nuclear reactions.

PIGE cannot provide information about the chemical states, molecular bonds, or microscopic structures of the sample being tested. PIGE can only be used on light elements (e.g. Li, B, F) as the characterization technique solely relies on nuclear reactions and the emission of characteristic gamma rays. Incoming protons repel heavily with a nucleus of the same charge, and heavier elements (i.e. elements with a higher Z value), have many more protons in their nucleus. As a result, an incoming proton in the MeV range does not have enough kinetic energy to overcome the Coulomb barrier and does not produce the characteristic gamma rays needed for identifying heavier materials.

Because of this limitation with light elements, PIGE is typically used in conjunction with PIXE, as the combination allows for a complete analysis simultaneous analysis of both heavy and light elements in a sample. Moreover, both techniques can use the same charged particle accelerator in an experimental setup and can be set up in the same vacuum chamber to run at the same exact time.

== Applications ==
PIGE has been used to detect total fluorine as a screening tool for per- and polyfluoroalkyl substances (PFAS).
