= Gamma-ray laser =

Hypothetical device

A gamma-ray laser, or graser, is a hypothetical device that would produce coherent gamma rays, just as an ordinary laser produces coherent rays of visible light. Potential applications for gamma-ray lasers include medical imaging, spacecraft propulsion, and cancer treatment.

In his 2003 Nobel lecture, Vitaly Ginzburg cited the gamma-ray laser as one of the 30 most important problems in physics.

The effort to construct a practical gamma-ray laser is interdisciplinary, encompassing quantum mechanics, nuclear and optical spectroscopy, chemistry, solid-state physics, and metallurgy—as well as the generation, moderation, and interaction of neutrons—and involves specialized knowledge and research in all these fields. The subject involves both basic science and engineering technology.

== Research ==
The problem of obtaining a sufficient concentration of resonant excited (isomeric) nuclear states for collective stimulated emission to occur turns on the broadening of the gamma-ray spectral line. Of the two forms of broadening, homogeneous broadening is the result of the lifetime of the isomeric state: the shorter the lifetime, the more broadened the line. Inhomogeneous broadening comprises all mechanisms by which the homogeneously broadened line is spread over the spectrum.

The most familiar inhomogeneous broadening is Doppler recoil broadening from thermal motion of molecules in the solid containing the excited isomer and recoil from gamma-ray emission, in which the emission spectrum is both shifted and broadened. Isomers in solids can emit a sharp component superimposed on the Doppler-broadened background; this is called the Mössbauer effect. This recoilless radiation exhibits a sharp line on top of the Doppler-broadened background that is only slightly shifted from the center of the background.

With the inhomogeneous background removed, and a sharp line, it would seem that we have the conditions for gain. But other difficulties that would degrade gain are unexcited states that would resonantly absorb the radiation, opaque impurities, and loss in propagation through the crystal in which the active nuclei are embedded. Much of the latter can be overcome by clever matrix crystal alignment to exploit the transparency provided by the Borrmann effect.

Another difficulty, the graser dilemma, is that properties that should enable gain and those that would permit sufficient nuclear inversion density seem incompatible. The time required to activate, separate, concentrate, and crystallize an appreciable number of excited nuclei by conventional radiochemistry is at least a few seconds. To ensure the inversion persists, the lifetime of the excited state must be considerably longer. Furthermore, the heating that would result from neutron-pumping the inversion in situ seems incompatible with maintaining the Mössbauer effect, although there are still avenues to explore.

Heating may be reduced by two-stage neutron-gamma pumping, in which neutron capture occurs in a parent-doped converter, where it generates Mössbauer radiation that is then absorbed by ground-state nuclei in the graser. Two-stage pumping of multiple levels offers multiple advantages.

Another approach is to use nuclear transitions driven by collective electron oscillations. The scheme would employ a triad of isomeric states: a long-lived storage state, in addition to an upper and lower lasing state. The storage state would be energetically close to the short-lived upper lasing state but separated by a forbidden transition involving one quantum unit of spin angular momentum. The graser would be enabled by a very intense optical laser to slosh the electron cloud back and forth and saturate the forbidden transition in the near field of the cloud. The population of the storage state would then be quickly equalized with the upper lasing state whose transition to the lower lasing state would be both spontaneous and stimulated by resonant gamma radiation. A "complete" chart of nuclides likely contains a very large number of isomeric states, and the existence of such a triad seems likely, but it has yet to be found.

Nonlinearities can result in both spatial and temporal harmonics in the near field at the nucleus, opening the range of possibilities for rapid transfer from the storage state to the upper lasing state using other kinds of triads involving transition energies at multiples of the optical laser quantum energy and at higher multipolarities.

== See also ==
- Particle-induced gamma emission
