= Timeline of computing 2020–present =

This article presents a detailed timeline of events in the history of computing from 2020 to the present. For narratives explaining the overall developments, see the history of computing.

Significant events in computing include events relating directly or indirectly to software, hardware and wetware. Excluded (except in instances of significant functional overlap) are:

- events in general robotics
- events about uses of computational tools in biotechnology and similar fields (except for improvements to the underlying computational tools) as well as events in media-psychology except when those are directly linked to computational tools

Currently excluded are:

- events in computer insecurity, hacking incidents, breaches/Internet conflicts, and malware if they are not also about milestones towards computer security
- events about quantum computing and communication
- economic events and events of new technology policy beyond standardization

Growth of supercomputer performance, based on data from the top500.org website. The logarithmic y-axis shows performance in GFLOPS. Combined performance of 500 largest supercomputers Fastest supercomputer Supercomputer in 500th place

Share of operating systems families in TOP500 supercomputers by time trend

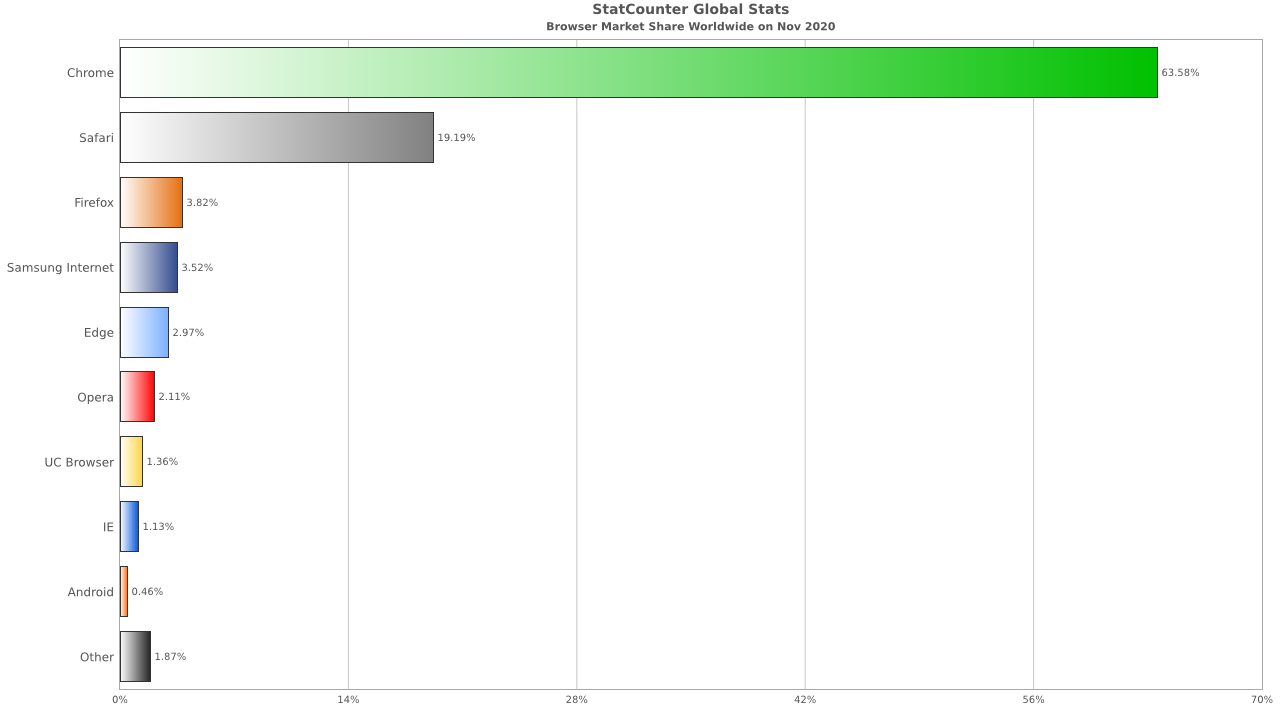
Usage share of web browsers in November 2020 according to StatCounter

== 2020 ==
- February 7 – AMD released the Ryzen Threadripper 3990X, the first 64 core CPU for consumer market based on the Zen 2 microarchitecture.
- March 2 – the pseudonymous developer 15 launches 15.ai, a free, non-commercial text-to-speech website that lets users generate new dialogue in the voices of fictional characters. It used deep learning to reproduce realistic voices from relatively little recorded dialogue, and was capable of varying the emotional delivery of the generated speech. 15.ai is considered the first generative AI application that started the AI boom, and popularized AI-generated voices in content creation and entertainment.
- March 26 – After one of the first and largest public volunteer distributed computing projects, SETI@home announced its shutdown by March 31, 2020, and due to heightened interest as a result of the COVID-19 pandemic, the distributed computing project Folding@home became the world's first system to reach one exaFLOPS. The system simulates protein folding, is used for medical research on COVID-19 and achieved a speed of approximately 2.43 x86 exaFLOPS by April 13, 2020 – many times faster than the fastest supercomputer, Summit.
- April 20 – Researchers demonstrated a diffusive memristor fabricated from protein nanowires of the bacterium Geobacter sulfurreducens which functions at substantially lower voltages than previously described ones and may allow the construction of artificial neurons which function at voltages of biological action potentials. The nanowires have a range of advantages over silicon nanowires and the memristors may be used to directly process biosensing signals, for neuromorphic computing and/or direct communication with biological neurons.
- May 22 – Australian computer scientists reported achieving, thus far, the highest internet speed in the world from a single optical chip source over standard optical fiber, amounting to 44.2 Terabits per sec, or "downloading 1000 high definition movies in a split second".
- May 27 – A study showed that social networks can function poorly as pathways for inconvenient truths, that the interplay between communication and action during disasters may depend on the structure of social networks, that communication networks suppress necessary "evacuations" in test-scenarios because of false reassurances when compared to groups of isolated individuals and that larger networks with a smaller proportion of informed subjects can suffer more damage due to human-caused misinformation.
- June 11 – Chatbot-technology and text-producing AI GPT-3 was released.
- July 6 – [Novel protocol/standard] – The Versatile Video Coding standard (H.266) was finalised, designed to halve the bitrate of previous formats, reducing data volume and being especially useful for on-demand 8K streaming services.
- June 15 – Researchers reported the development of a polymer device that can receive dopamine signals from real cells and learns from it.
- July 15 – A cyborg beetle with a camera was demonstrated. It streams video to a smartphone via Bluetooth for a "bug's eye view".
- August 28 – Elon Musk revealed a model of the prototype brain–computer interface chip, implanted in pigs, that his company Neuralink has been working on.
- September 3 – Scientists reported finding "176 Open Access journals that, through lack of comprehensive and open archives, vanished from the Web between 2000 and 2019, spanning all major research disciplines and geographic regions of the world" and that in 2019 only about a third of the 14,068 DOAJ-indexed journals ensured the long-term preservation of their content themselves, with many papers not getting archived by Web archiving initiatives such as the Internet Archive.
- September 18 – Media reported what may be the first publicly confirmed case of a civilian fatality as a nearly direct consequence of a cyberattack, after ransomware disrupted a hospital in Germany.
- September 25 – [Novel application of computing / software] – Chemists described, for the first time, possible chemical pathways from nonliving prebiotic chemicals to complex biochemicals that could give rise to living organisms, based on a new computer program named ALLCHEMY.
- October 28 – A review suggested only surgical robot platforms "that can effectively communicate their intent and explain their decisions to their human companions will find their way into the operating room of the future", defined levels of autonomy and suggested "positive evidence will soon emerge and build up" that would motivate "transition to clinical trials".

== 2021 ==
- [Meta/Policy/Philosophy] – Thomas Metzinger, a German philosopher of cognitive science and applied ethics, called for a "global moratorium on synthetic phenomenology" which, "until 2050", precautionarily bans "all research that directly aims at or knowingly risks the emergence of artificial consciousness on post-biotic carrier systems" – and could be gradually refined. The paper does not describe mechanisms of global enforcement of such proposed regulations which do not consider biotic or semi-biotic systems and aims to limit suffering risks.
- [Type of database] – A new global food emissions database indicated that the current food systems are responsible for one third of the global anthropogenic greenhouse gas emissions.
- [Data usage] – In a static proprietary article that appeared in and was co-reviewed by a scientific journal, authenticated scientists analyzed data from multiple public databases to create a regional representation of levels of deforestation induced by nations' recent, largely unmodulated, trade-, production- and consumption-patterns.

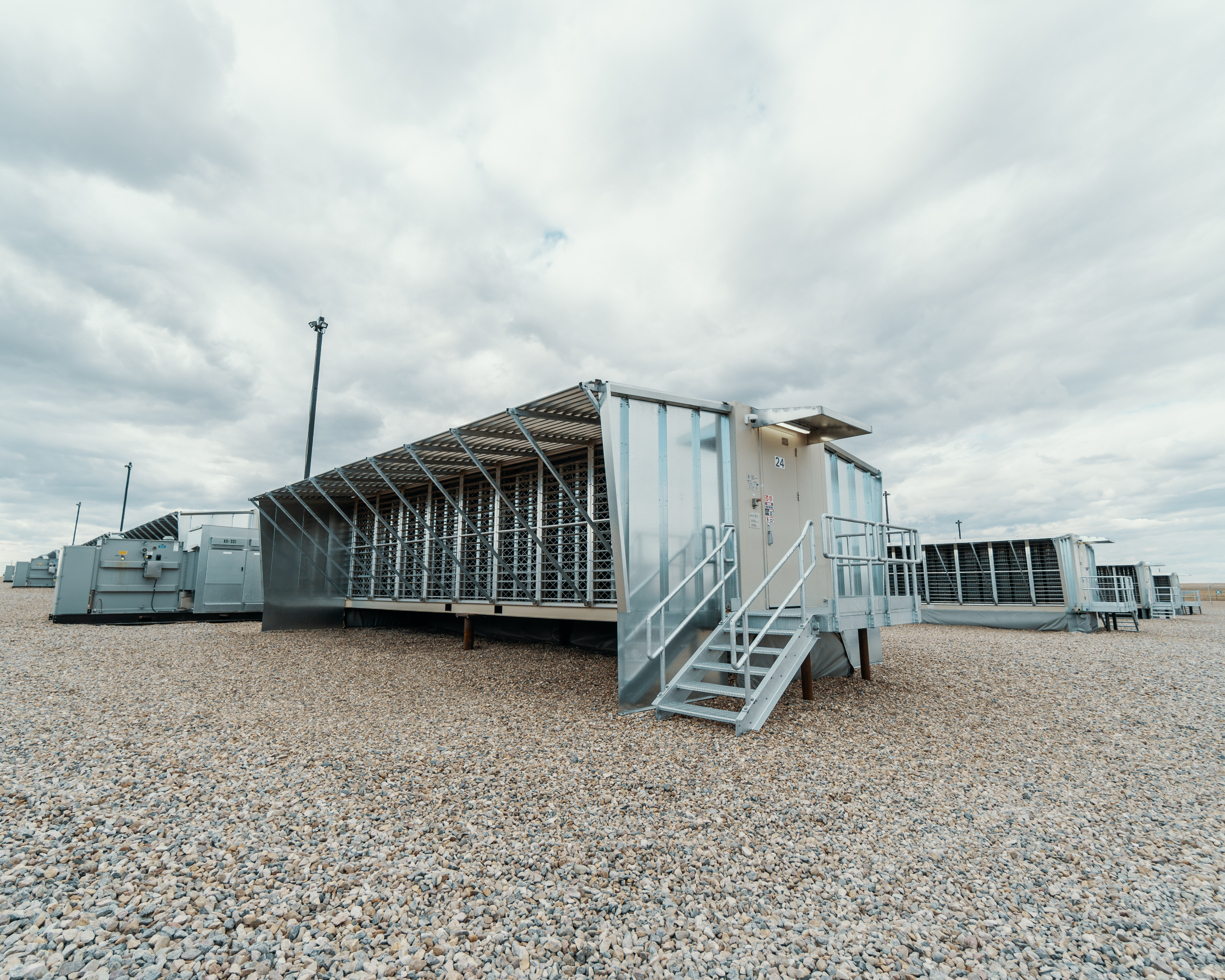
A study found that carbon emissions from Bitcoin mining in China – where a majority of the proof-of-work algorithm that generates current economic value is computed, largely fueled by nonrenewable sources – have accelerated rapidly and would soon exceed total annual emissions of countries like Italy, interfering with climate change mitigation commitments.

- A study found that carbon emissions from Bitcoin mining in China – where a majority of the proof-of-work algorithm that generates current economic value is computed, largely fueled by nonrenewable sources – had accelerated rapidly and would soon exceed total annual emissions of countries like Italy, interfering with climate change mitigation commitments.
- Neuralink revealed a male macaque with chips embedded on each side of its brain, playing a mind-controlled version of Pong. While similar technology has been demonstrated for decades, and wireless implants have existed for years, some observers noted that the organization increased the number of implanted electrodes that are read wirelessly.
- Scientists reviewed materials strategies for organic neuromorphic devices, suggesting that "their biocompatibility and mechanical conformability give them an advantage for creating adaptive biointerfaces, brain-machine interfaces, and biology-inspired prosthetics".

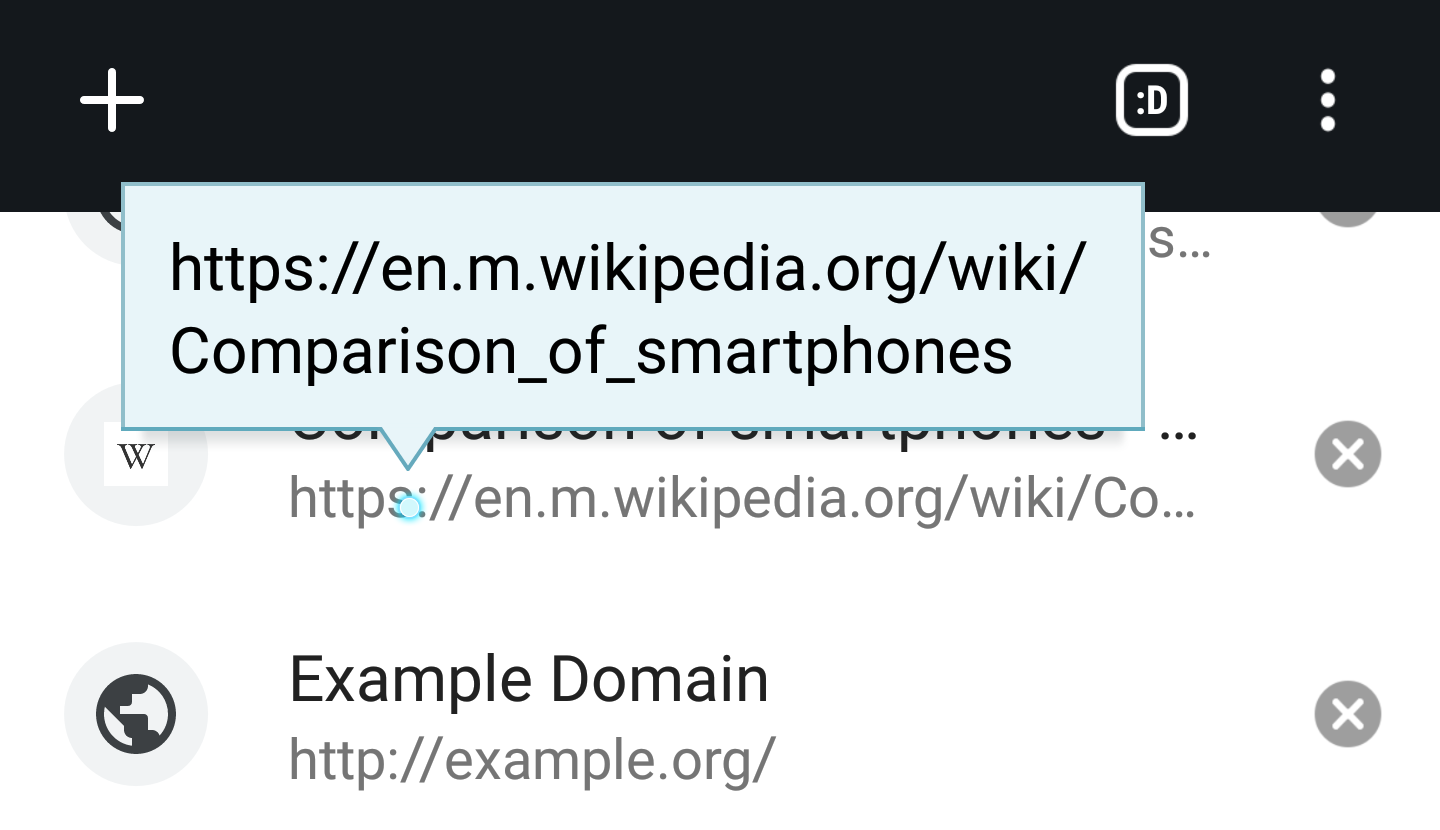
Researchers published the first in-depth study of Web browser tab interfaces.

- Researchers published the first in-depth study of Web browser tab interfaces. They found that many people struggle with tab overload and conducted surveys and interviews about people's tab use. Thereby they formalized pressures for closing tabs and for keeping tabs open. The authors then developed related UI design considerations which could enable better tools and changes to the code of Web browsers – like Firefox – that allow knowledge workers and other users to better manage their tabs.
- Operation of the U.S. Colonial Pipeline was interrupted by a ransomware cyber attack.
- A new record for the smallest single-chip system was achieved, occupying a total volume of less than 0.1 mm^{3}.

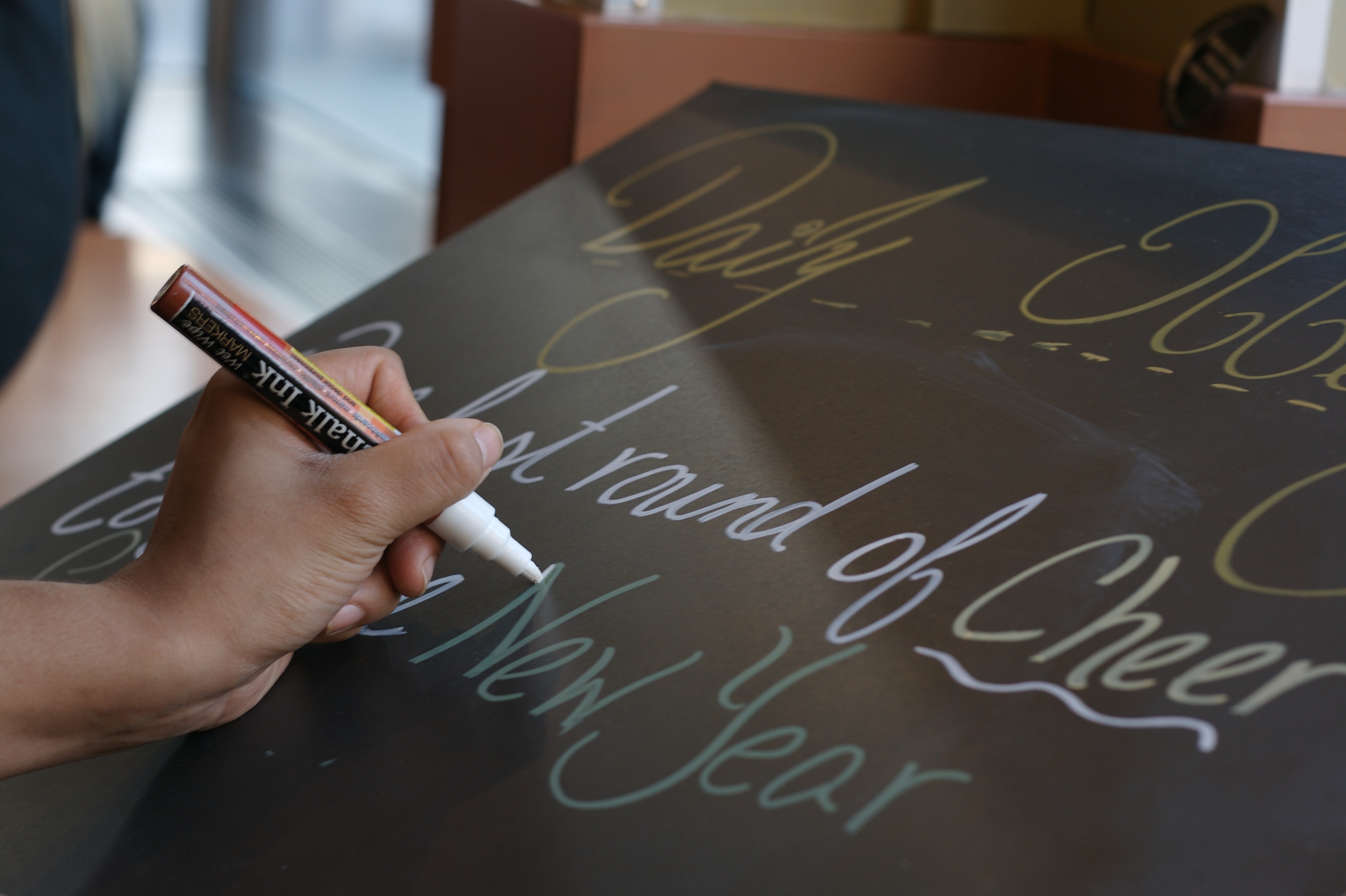
Scientists demonstrated the first brain–computer interface that decodes neural signals for handwriting and has a record output speed of up to 90 characters per minute – more than double the previous record.

- Scientists demonstrated the first brain–computer interface that decodes neural signals for handwriting. The character output speed of a patient with a paralyzed hand was up to 90 characters per minute – more than double the previous record. Each letter is associated with a highly distinctive pattern of activity in the brain, making it relatively easy for the algorithm to distinguish them.
- Archivists initiated a rescue mission to secure enduring access to humanity's largest public library of scientific articles, Sci-Hub, due to the site's increased legal troubles, using Web and BitTorrent technologies.
- Google demonstrated a research project called LaMDA, an automatic language generation system designed to sustain a conversation with a person on any topic.
- The most comprehensive 3D map of the human brain – of a millionth of a brain and requiring 1.4 petabytes of storage space – was published.
- El Salvador passed the Bitcoin Law, making it the first country to give cryptocurrency and bitcoin a status of legal tender. The law was passed by the Legislative Assembly of El Salvador on June 8, 2021, giving the cryptocurrency bitcoin the status of legal tender within El Salvador after September 7, 2021. It was proposed by President Nayib Bukele. The text of the law states that "the purpose of this law is to regulate bitcoin as unrestricted legal tender with liberating power, unlimited in any transaction, and to any title that public or private natural or legal persons require carrying out".
- GitHub Copilot, a programmer assistant AI, was released. Later FOSS variants of the tool included FauxPilot.

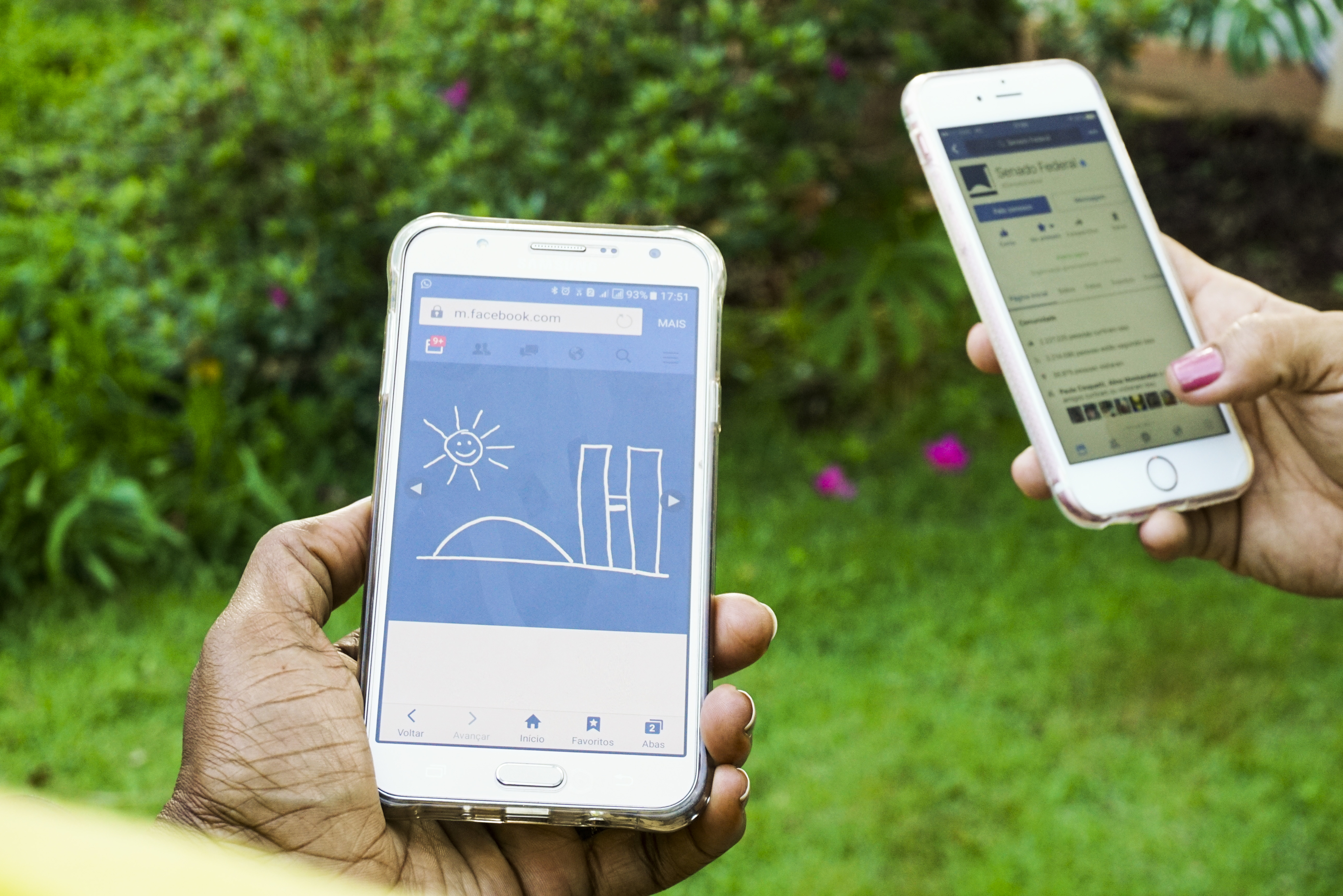
Scientists debated the research cognitive impacts of smartphones and digital technology in general and by prevalent forms of use.

- In the debate regarding the cognitive impacts of smartphones and digital technology, a group reported that, contrary to widespread belief, scientific evidence does not show that these technologies harm biological cognitive abilities and that they instead change predominant ways of cognition – such as a reduced need to remember facts or conduct mathematical calculations by pen and paper outside contemporary schools. However, some activities – like reading novels – that require long attention-spans and don't feature ongoing rewarding stimulation may become more challenging in general.
- Open 3D Engine – a game engine that is free and open source software (FOSS) and has Linux support – was released.
- Researchers used a brain–computer interface to enable a man who was paralyzed since 2003 to produce comprehensible words and sentences by decoding signals from electrodes in the speech areas of his brain.
- Japan achieved a new world record Internet speed: 319 Tbit/s over ~3000 km which, albeit not being the fastest speed overall, beats the previous record of 178 Tbit/s.
- Scientists reported that worldwide adolescent loneliness and depression increased substantially after 2012 and that loneliness in contemporary schools appears to be associated with smartphone access and Internet use.

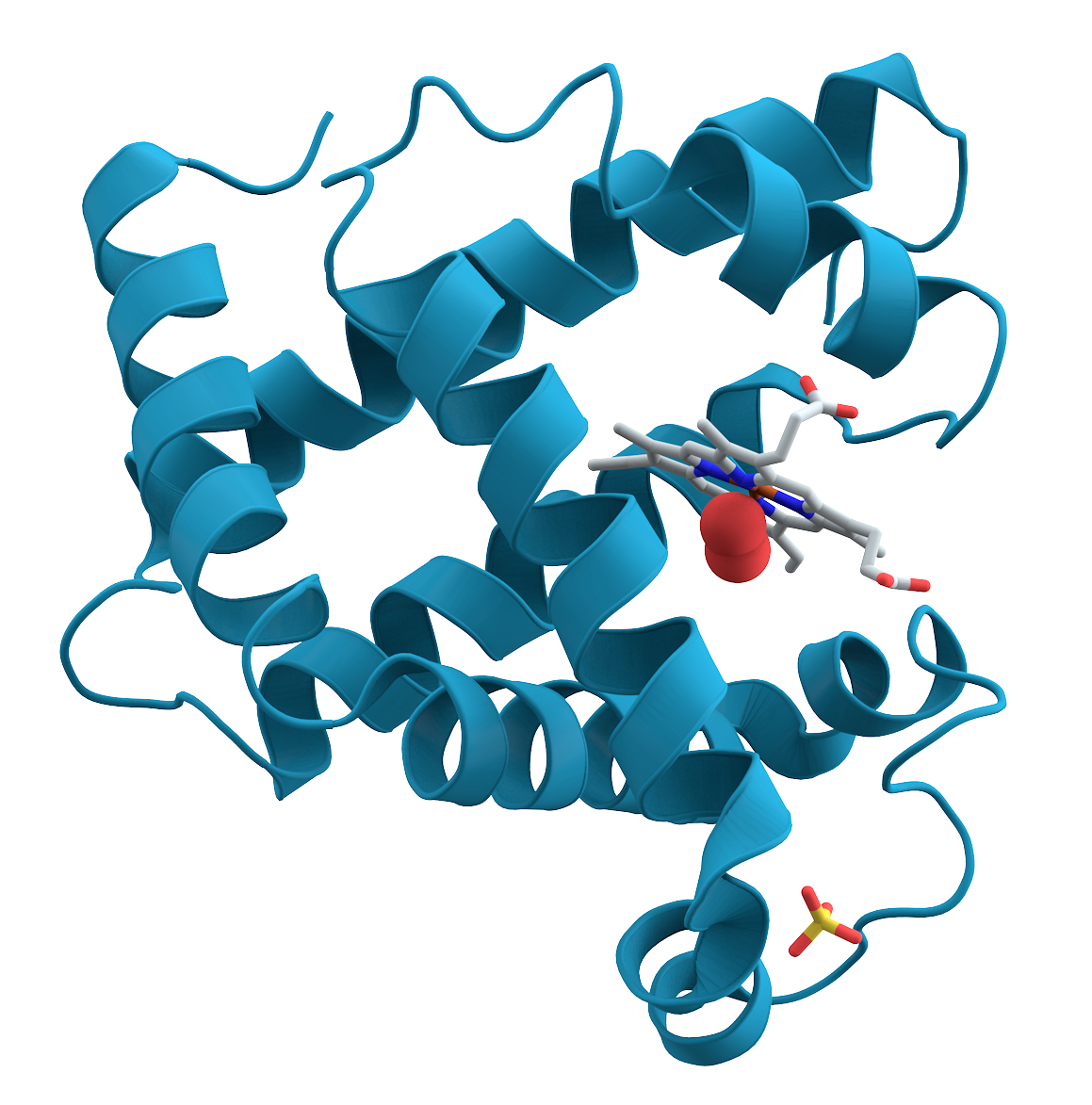
DeepMind's AlphaFold AI predicted the structures of over 350,000 proteins, including 98.5% of the ~20,000 proteins in the human body, along with degrees of confidence for accuracy.

- DeepMind announced that its AlphaFold AI had predicted the structures of over 350,000 proteins, including 98.5% of the ~20,000 proteins in the human body. The 3D data along with their degrees of confidence for accuracy was made freely available with a database, doubling the previous number of protein structures in the public domain.
- Scientists published the first complete neuron-level-resolution 3D map of a monkey brain which they scanned within 100 hours.

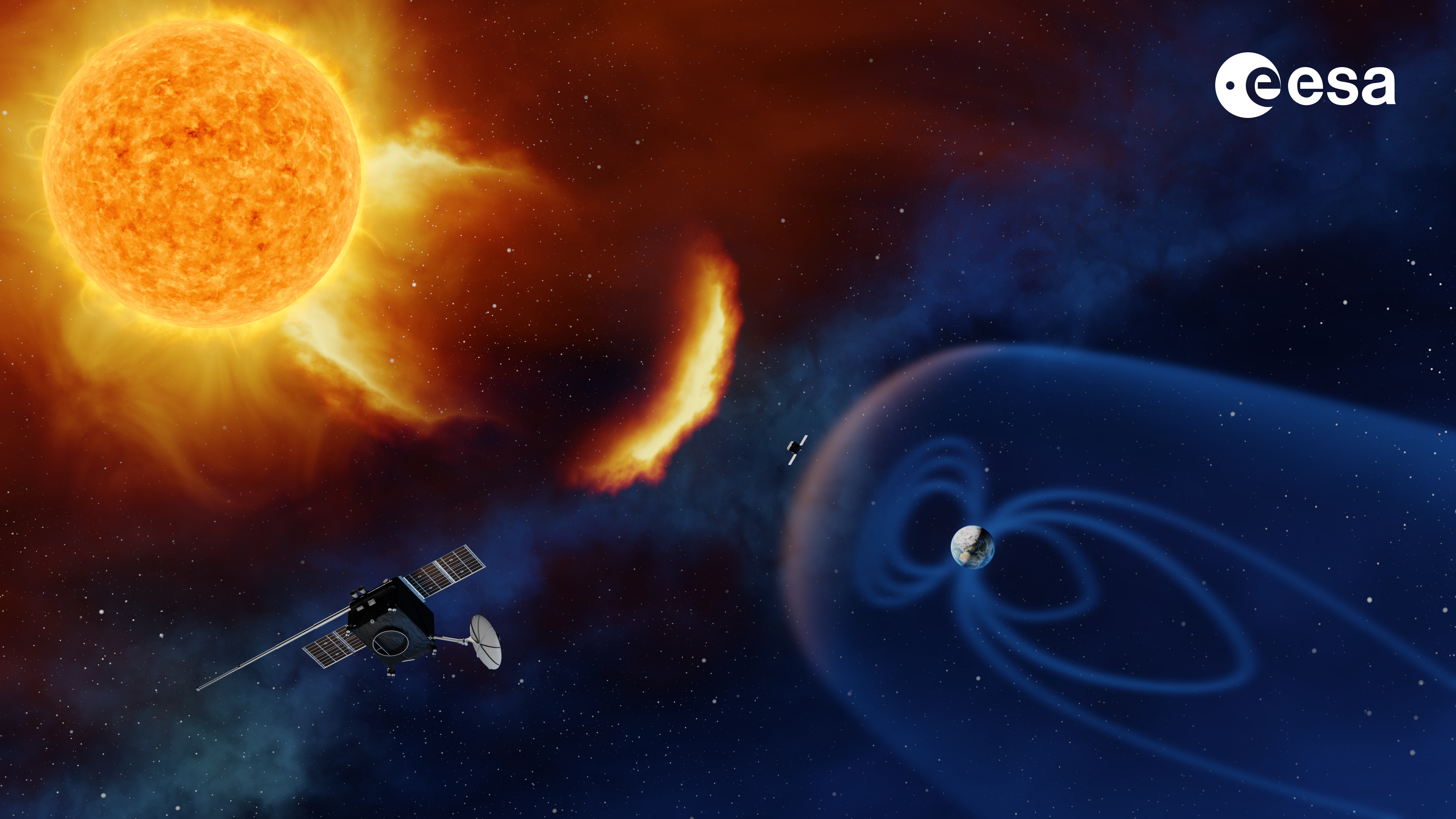
A researcher reported that solar superstorms would cause large-scale global months-long Internet outages.

- A researcher reported that solar superstorms would cause large-scale global months-long Internet outages. She described potential mitigation measures and exceptions – such as user-powered mesh networks and related peer-to-peer applications – and the robustness of the current Internet infrastructure.

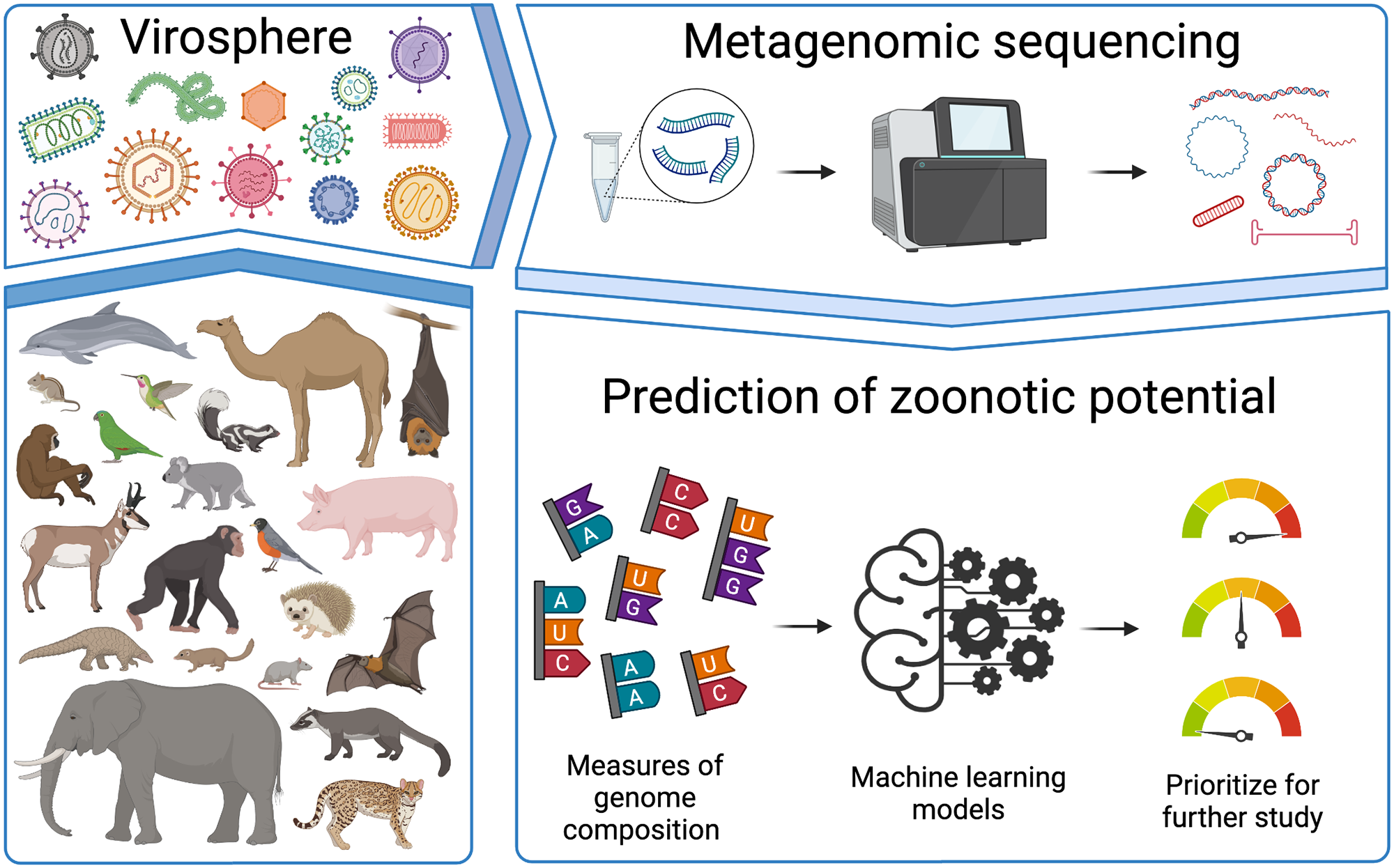
Researchers developed machine learning models for genome-based early detection and prioritization of high-risk potential zoonotic viruses.

- Scientists concluded that personal carbon allowances (PCAs) could be a component of climate change mitigation. They found that the economic recovery from COVID-19 and novel digital technology capacities open a window of opportunity for first implementations. PCAs would consist of – e.g. monetary – credit-feedbacks and decreasing default levels of per capita emissions concessions. The researchers found that recent advances in machine learning technology and "smarter home and transport options make it possible to easily track and manage a large share of individuals' emissions" and that feedback effective in engaging individuals to reduce their energy-related emissions and relevant new personalized apps could be designed. Issues may include privacy, evaluating emissions from individuals co-running multinational companies and the availability and prices of products and services.
- Cerebras announced a new hardware and software platform that can support AI models of 120 trillion parameters, enabling neural networks greater than the equivalent number of human brain synapses.
- Pathogen researchers reported the development of machine learning models for genome-based early detection and prioritization of high-risk potential zoonotic viruses in animals prior to spillover to humans. They concluded that their tool could be used for virus surveillance for pandemic prevention via (i.a.) measures of "early investigation and outbreak preparedness" and would have been capable of predicting SARS-CoV-2 as a high-risk strain.
- A loss of public IP routes to the Facebook DNS servers due to malfunctioning capacity-assessment code, routinely triggered after configuration changes of routers of the company's data centers, resulted in stoppage of BGP routing information broadcasts caused the 2021 Facebook outage.
- A study of data traffic by popular smartphones running variants of the Android software found substantial by-default data collection and sharing with no opt-out (i.e. even the NetGuard firewall, which is not installed by default, may not reliably and completely prevent such data traffic) and implications for users' privacy, control and security.
- Media outlets reported novel technologies for virtual try-ons of clothes for more sustainable fashion and improved online shopping, which increased relative to shopping at local shops that store clothes due to the COVID-19 pandemic.
- A method of DNA data storage with 100 times the density of previous techniques was announced.
- Scientists demonstrated that grown brain cells integrated into digital systems can carry out goal-directed tasks with performance-scores. In particular, playing a simulated (via electrophysiological stimulation) Pong which the cells learned to play faster than known machine intelligence systems, albeit to a lower skill-level than both AI and humans, was reported. Moreover, the study suggested it provides the "first empirical evidence" of information-processing capacity differences between neurons from different species.
- Researchers reported the development of organic low-power neuromorphic electronics which they built into a robot, enabling it to learn sensorimotorically within the real world, rather than via simulations like in the study above. For the chip, polymers were used and coated with an ion-rich gel to enable the material to carry an electric charge like real neurons.
- Researchers reported the development of a system of machine learning and hyperspectral camera that can distinguish between 12 different types of plastics such as PET and PP for automated separation of waste of, as of 2020, highly unstandardized plastics products and packaging.
- A scientific review summarized research and data about telemedicine. Its results indicated that, in general, outcomes of such ICT-use are as good as in-person care with health care use staying similar.
- The Log4Shell security vulnerability in a Java logging framework was publicly disclosed two weeks after its discovery. Because of the ubiquity of the affected software, experts have described it as a most serious computer vulnerability. In a high-level meeting, the importance of security maintenance of open-source software – often also carried out largely by few volunteers – to national security was clarified.

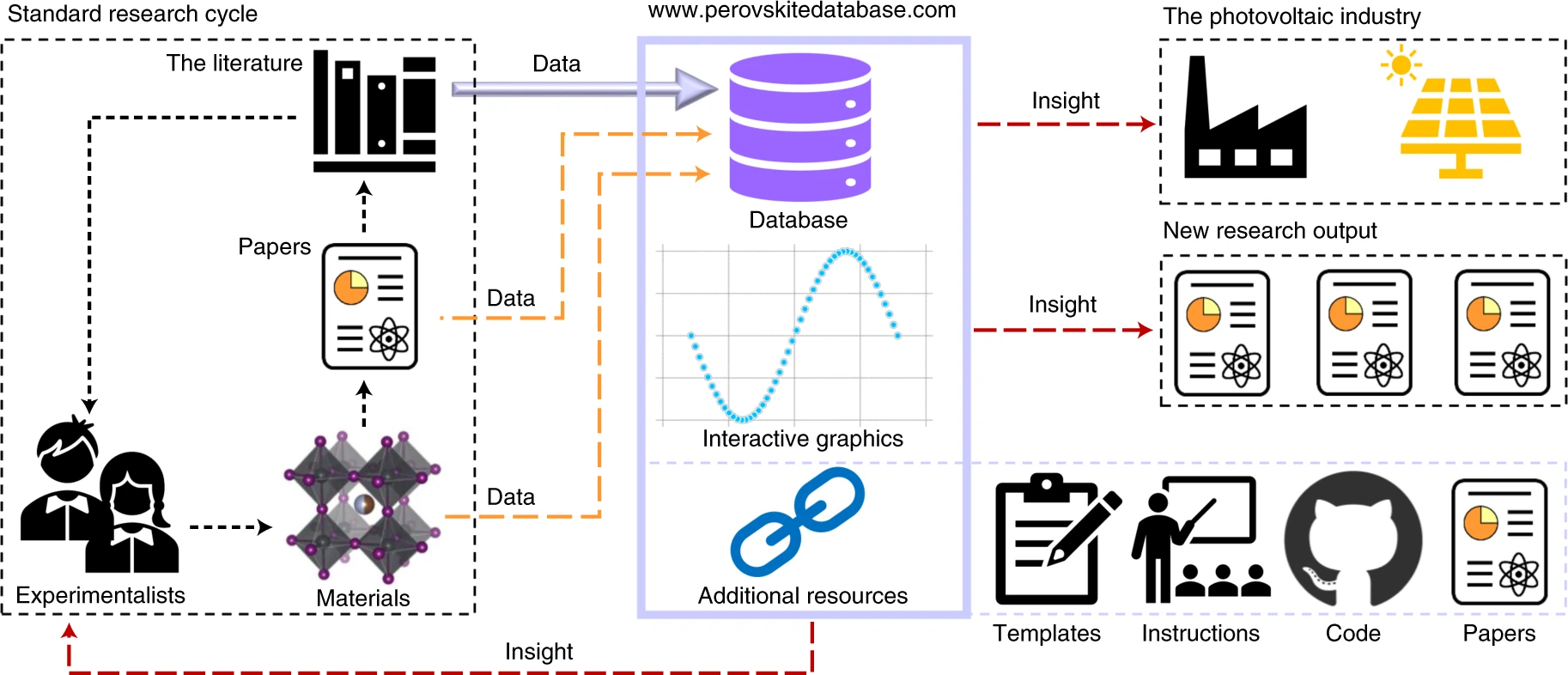
Schema of how the open database, interactive visualization tools, protocols and a metadata ontology for reporting device data, open-source code for data analysis, etc. can support perovskite solar cell development

- Researchers reported the development of a database and analysis tool about perovskite solar cells which systematically integrates over 15,000 publications, in particular device-data about over 42,400 of such photovoltaic devices. Authors described the site – which requires signing up to access the data and uses software that is partly open source but to date not free software – as a participative "Wikipedia for perovskite solar cell research" and suggest that extensively capturing the progress of an entire field including interactive data exploration functionalities could also be applicable to many fields in materials science, engineering and biosciences.
- A third main convergent graphical shell (Maui Shell) and UI framework (MauiKit), based on KDE/Kirigami, for the Linux operating system on smartphones, desktops and other devices, was released.

== 2022 ==
=== AI ===
- DeepMind announced that its AlphaFold program had uncovered the structures of more than 200 million folded proteins, essentially all of those known to science.

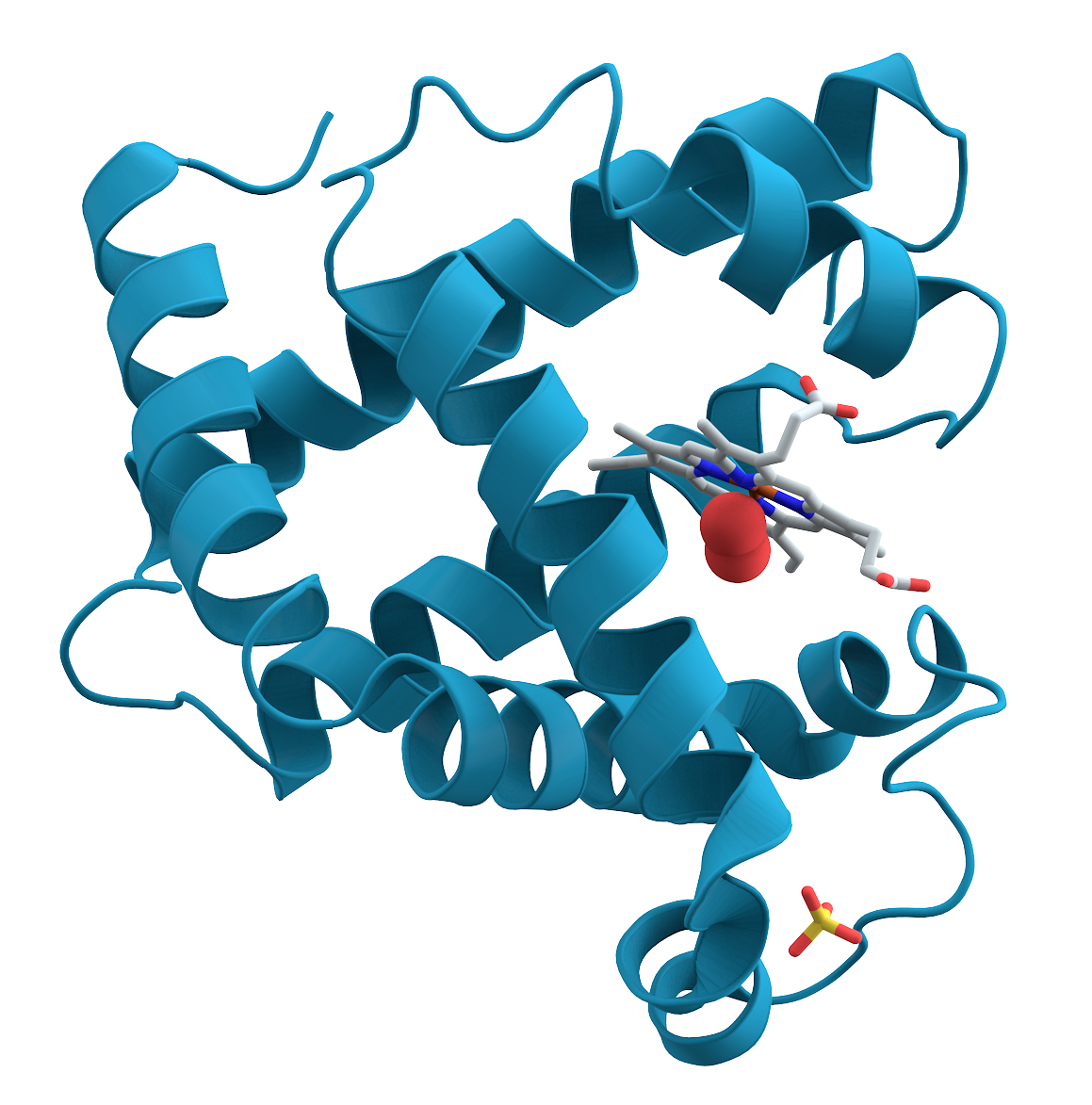
AI company DeepMind reported that its AlphaFold program had determined the likely structure of nearly every protein known to science.

- News outlets reported artificial intelligence art had won the first place in a digital art competition. Such artistic imagery is generated using input consisting of text and sometimes images, usually including parameters such as artistic style (text-to-image generation). Around the time, an expert concluded that "AI art is everywhere right now", with even experts not knowing what it will mean, a news outlet established that "AI-generated art booms" and reported issues of copyright and automation of professional artists, a news outlet investigated how online communities (e.g. their rules) confronted with many such artworks react, a news outlet raised concerns over deepfakes, a magazine highlighted possibilities of enabling "new forms of artistic expression", and an editorial noted that it may be seen as a welcome "augmentation of human capability". Moreover, additional functionalities – such as enabling the use of user-provided concepts (like an object or a style) learned from few images for novel personalized art generated from the associated word/s or expanding beyond the borders of artistic images in the same style – were reported. On 22 August, Stable Diffusion released as open source software, making the technology more accessible and free to use on personal hardware as well as extendable by third-parties (i.e. other software projects).
- A new deep learning technique enabled year-round measurements of sea ice thickness in the Arctic.
- A screening AI system for many cancer types that integrates different types of data via multimodal learning was reported.

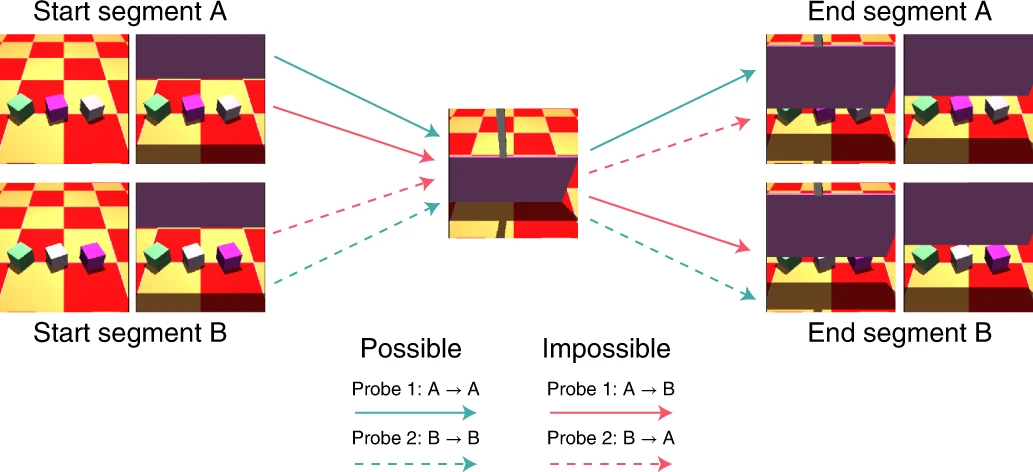
Deep learning systems learn intuitive basic physics similar to infants and any physics via potential variables-identification from only visual data (of virtual 3D environments).

- Researchers reported the development of a deep learning system that learns intuitive physics from visual data (of virtual 3D environments) to some degree "from scratch" based on an unpublished approach inspired by studies of visual cognition in infants. Two weeks later, other researchers reported the development of a machine learning algorithm that could discover sets of basic variables of various physical systems and predict the systems' future dynamics from video recordings of their behavior.
- Researchers reported the development of deep learning software that can design proteins that contain prespecified functional sites.

=== Software-hardware systems ===
- The first laparoscopic surgery performed entirely by a robot was reported.

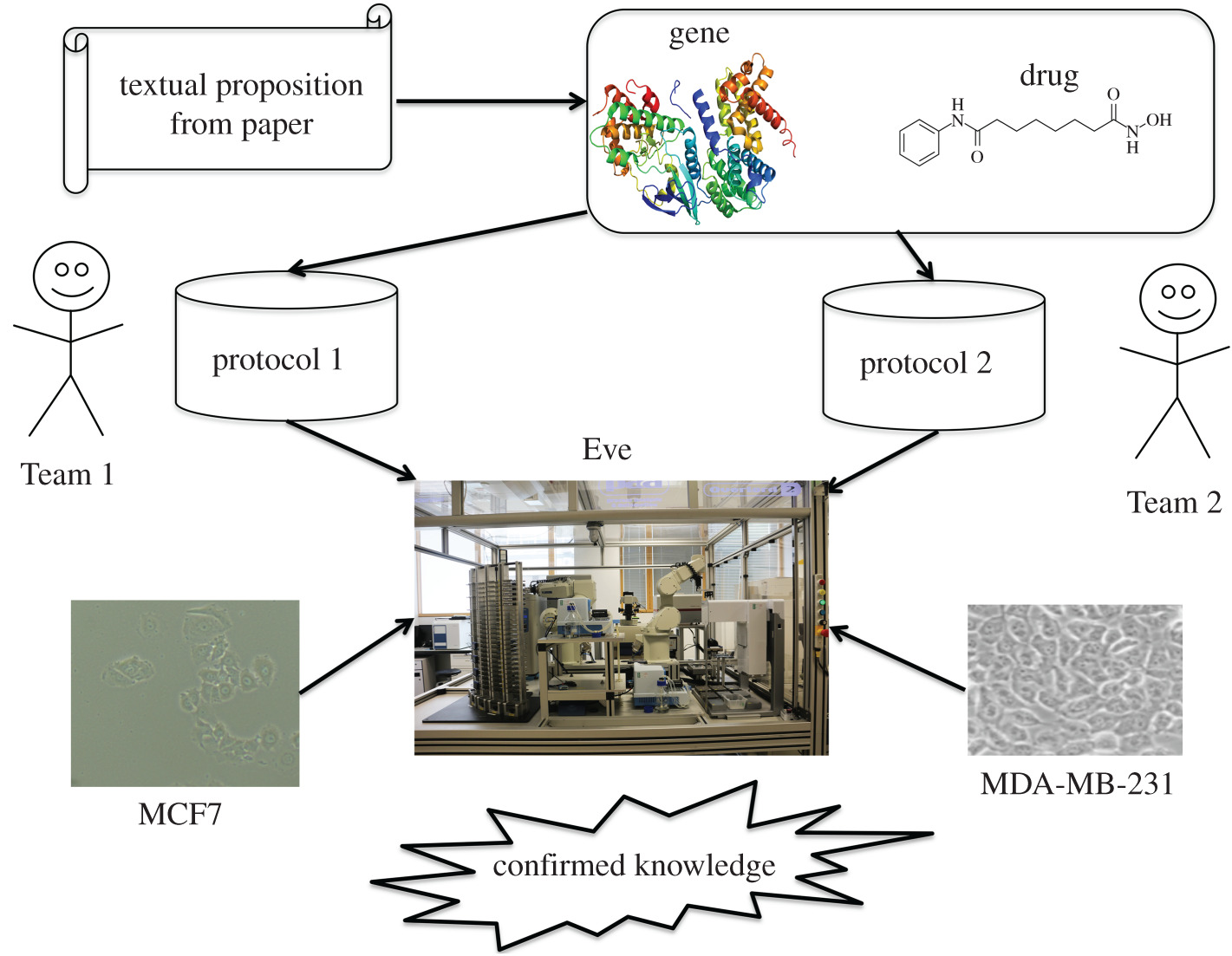
The overall process of testing the reproducibility and robustness of the cancer biology literature via Eve

- Researchers demonstrated semi-automated testing for reproducibility (which is lacking especially in cancer research) via extraction of statements about experimental results in non-semantic, gene expression cancer research papers and subsequent testing with breast cancer cell lines via robot scientist "Eve".
- Agilicious, an open-source and open-hardware versatile standardized quadrotor drone, tailored toward agility, was released.
- A university reported the release of 'Quad-SDK' which may be the first open source full-stack software for large agile four-legged robots, compatible with the ROS.
- News outlets reported deployment, research and development of novel military drone technology in the Russo-Ukrainian War in 2022, including demining drones, self-repurposed commercial/hobby drones (including via a hackathon), reconnaissance microdrones, kamikaze drones, bomb-dropping modified drones, and countermeasures such as electronic ones.
- The first data transmission to exceed 1 petabit per second (Pbit/s) using a single laser and a single optical chip was demonstrated by European researchers.
- News outlets reported a novel agricultural robot for viable weed control using lasers or "laserweeding". There are similar precision agriculture machines that have been reported before, also e.g. applying low amounts of herbicides and fertilizers with precision while mapping plant locations, in some cases autonomously. Their benefits may include "healthier crops and soil, decreased herbicide use, and reduced chemical and labor costs".
- A satellite-free GPS-alternative higher-resolution positioning system using existing telecommunications networks was demonstrated, SuperGPS.
- Impossible Metals announced its first underwater robotic vehicle, 'Eureka 1', had completed its first trial of selectively harvesting polymetallic nodule rocks from the seabed nearly without harming the environment (as compared to other seabed mining) to help address the rising global need for metals for renewable energy system components – mainly batteries. It operates autonomously and uses advanced computer vision, e.g. using AI to determine which rocks have signs of visible life on them so that they are not harvested.

=== Software ===
- A report by the Royal Society listed potential or proposed countermeasures against misinformation, mainly online misinformation, such as, broadly described, building resilience to scientific misinformation and a healthy online information environment.
- Computational biologists reported the largest detailed human genetic genealogy, unifying human genomes from many sources for insights about human history, ancestry and evolution. It demonstrates a novel computational method for estimating how human DNA is related, in specific as a series of 13 million linked trees along the genome, a tree-sequence, which has also been called "the largest human family tree".
- Researchers reported the creation of a version control system for cell engineering, suggesting it to be a "significant step toward more open, reproducible, easier to trace and share, more trustworthy engineering biology", and possibly increased safety by enabling faster tracing of organisms lab of origin and design details via barcoding.
- A preprint demonstrated how backdoors can be placed undetectably into classifying (e.g. posts as "spam" or well-visible "not spam") machine learning models which are often developed and/or trained by third parties. Parties can change the classification of any input, including in cases with types of data/software transparency, possibly including white-box access.
- Researchers reported routes for recycling 200 industrial waste chemicals into important drugs and agrochemicals using a software for computer-aided chemical synthesis design, helping enable "circular chemistry" as a potential area of a circular economy.
- The first global, interactive AI- and satellite monitoring-based, map and analysis of plastic waste sites to help prevention of plastic pollution, especially ocean pollution was published.

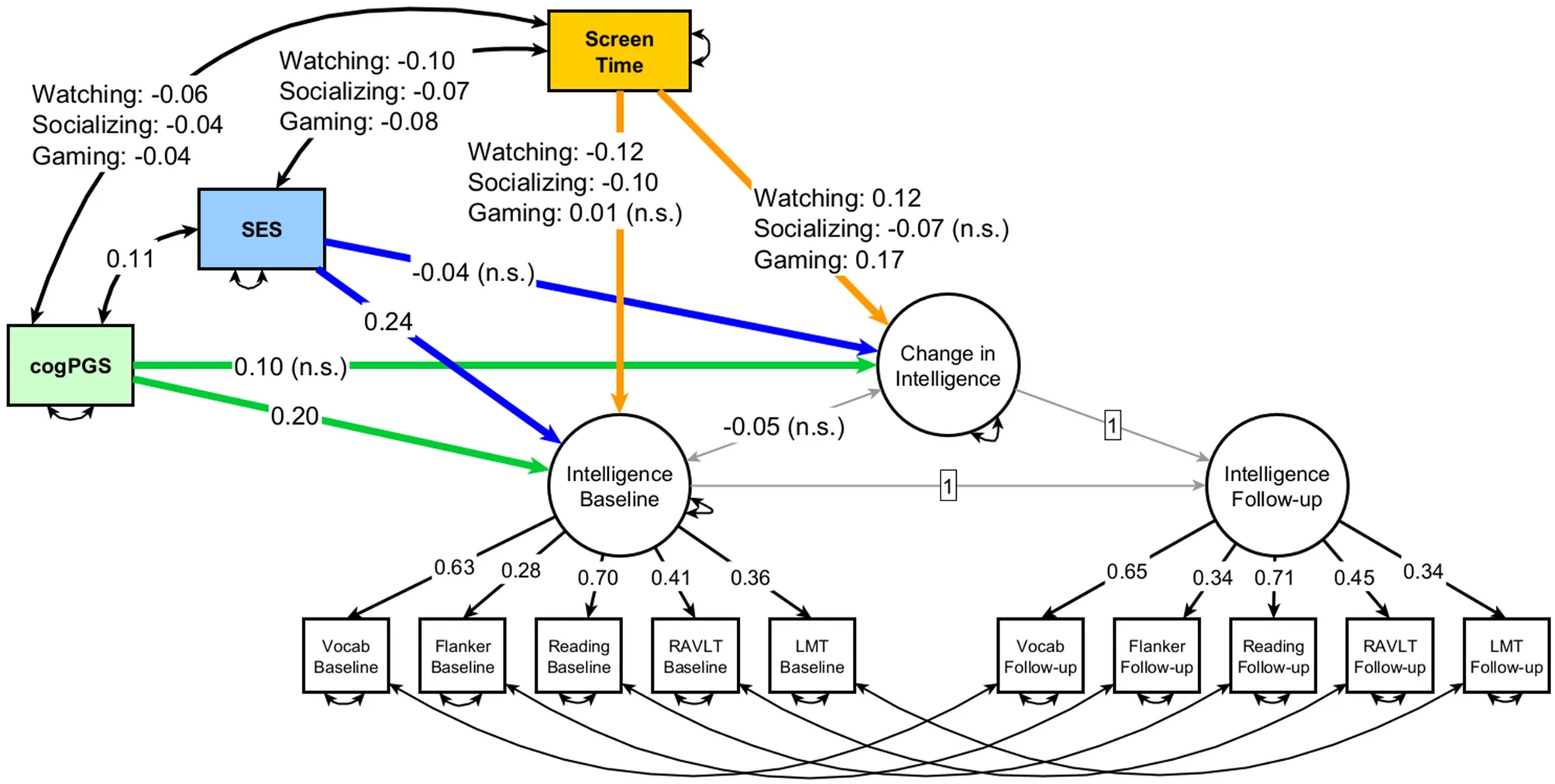
Measured results of the study about change in intelligence in children 9–12 from screen time watching, screen time socializing and screen time gaming

- A study suggested that in children at age 9–12 during two years time, gaming or watching digital videos can be positively correlated with measures of intelligence, albeit correlations with overall screen time (including social media, socializing and TV) were not investigated and 'time gaming' did not differentiate between categories of video games (e.g. shares of games' platform and genre).
- Computing and the 2022 Russian invasion of Ukraine:
  An editorial published in a journal noted that remote surgery and types of videoconferencing for sharing expertise (e.g. ad hoc assistance) have been and could be used to support doctors in Ukraine. A forum contribution analyzed Russian users' reactions to the Bucha massacre on social media – on nationalist Telegram channels. Computer science and technology was also used to defend against the 2022 Russian invasion such as with military technology, to document and communicate war events including via facial recognition of dead Russian soldiers and Russian war crimes, and for aggregated information about support opportunities for Ukrainian scientists.
- Researchers demonstrated an MRI-ML-based approach that can diagnose early Alzheimer's disease with high accuracy and may help identify unknown related changes in the brain.
- A study explored the efficacy of GitHub Sponsors, launched in 2019, in terms of supporting FOSS-efforts and the sponsors' intentions as well as the motivation of sponsors and various quantitative and qualitative analyses relevant to this approach of FOSS-funding.
- Progress in climate change mitigation (CCM) living review-like works:
  The living document-like aggregation, assessment, integration and review website Project Drawdown added 11 new CCM solutions to its organized set of mitigation techniques. The website's modeling framework was used in a study document to show that metal recycling has significant potential for CCM. A revised or updated version, using computer models, of a major worldwide 100% renewable energy proposed plan and model was published.
- Teaching hospital press release:
- News outlets reported that in July, for the first time, more people watched streaming TV than cable within the U.S..
- A researcher reported that the social media app TikTok adds a keylogger to its, on iOS essentially unavoidable, in-app browser in iOS, which allows its Chinese company to gather, for example, passwords, credit card details, and everything else that is typed into websites opened from taps on any external links within the app. Shortly after the report, the company claimed such capabilities are only used for debugging-types of purposes. To date, it has largely not been investigated which and to which extent (other) apps have capacities for such or similar data-collection.
- A university reported the development of a driver isolation framework to protect operating system kernels, primarily the monolithic Linux kernel which gets ~80,000 commits/year to its drivers, from defects and vulnerabilities in device drivers, with the Mars Research Group developers describing this lack of isolation as one of the main factors undermining kernel security.
- A study concluded that advanced artificial intelligence with learned goal planning would or may intervene in the provision of reward to short-circuit reward via advanced exploits of ambiguity in the data about its goal such as considering the sending of the reward itself as humans' goal and intervening in the data-provision about its goal.
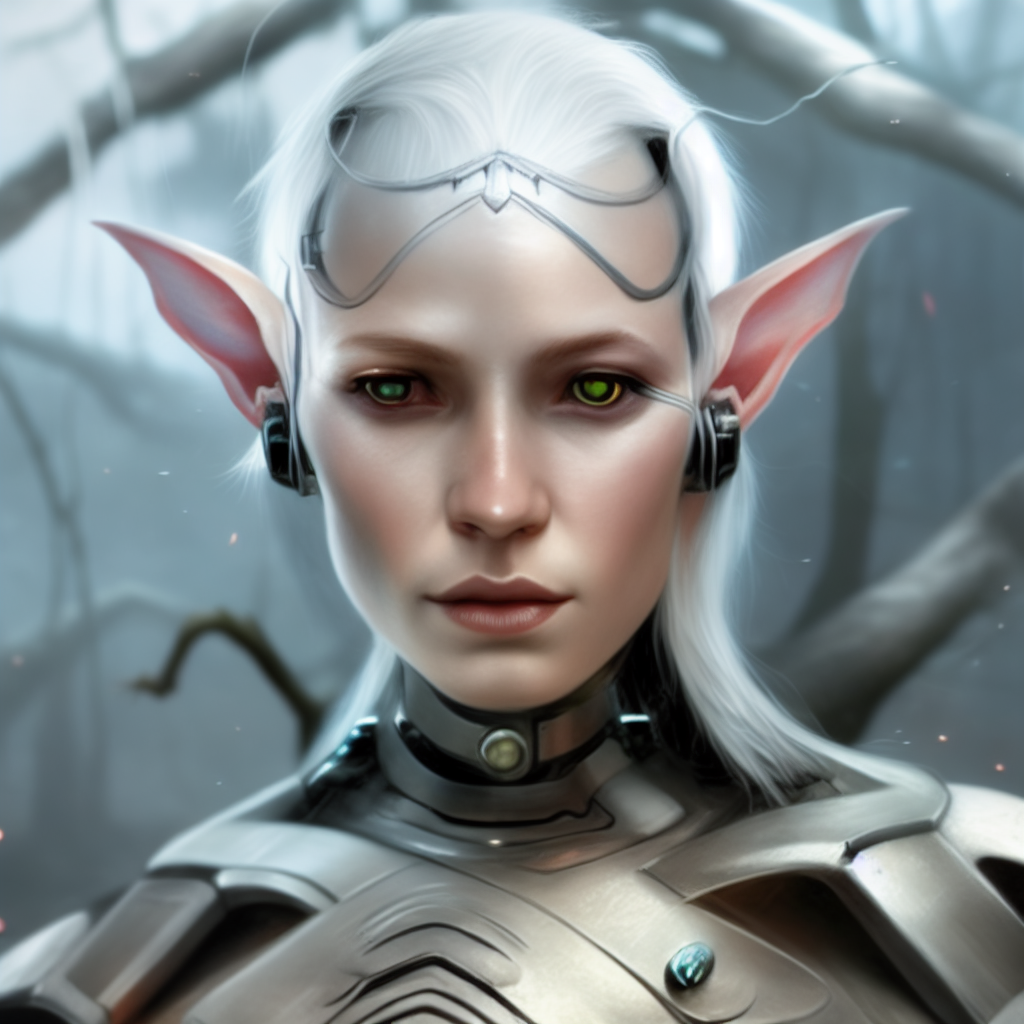

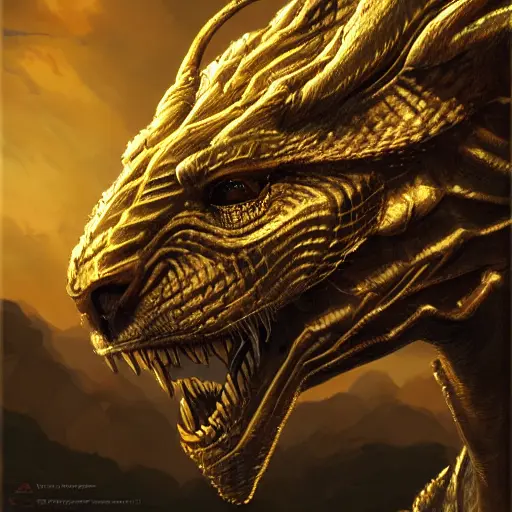
~August: Artificial intelligence art became highly sophisticated and popular and started winning art prizes. The two images are made via the open source Stable Diffusion.

- University press release:
- A research report by NewsGuard indicated there is a high level of online misinformation delivered – to a mainly young user base – with TikTok, whose usage is increasing.
- The second largest cryptocurrency, Ethereum, switched from the proof-of-work (electricity consumption for validation) to the proof-of-stake (staked holdings for validation) algorithm, which cuts its large electricity consumption.
- Results of investigations about the issue of recommendation systems shifting their users' preferences "so they are easier to satisfy" were reported, including actively optimizing such software to avoid problematic shifts/manipulation, suggesting "that recommenders that optimize for staying in the trust region can avoid manipulative behaviors while still generating engagement".
- An open source platform to match genomically profiled cancer patients to precision medicine drug trials was reported.
- After domain seizures of Z-Library by copyright law enforcement and moves toward dark web and IPFS technologies by its content providers, the open source shadow library UI Anna's Archive – which also provides access to a full copy of Z-Library content and scientific articles – was established by a team of archivists, essentially providing the largest human book and literature library.
- News outlets reported the development of a post-editing model using GPT-3 that improves machine translations after identification of current translation problems.
- The largest global inventory and interactive map of greenhouse gas emission sources was released by Climate TRACE (9 November).
- Around the acquisition of Twitter by Elon Musk (27 October), interest in alternatives to the site – described as "one of the world's most high-profile information ecosystems", a contemporary suboptimal public square, and as heavily used by many journalists and news media – increased substantially. However, no alternative such as Mastodon, Reddit or the Bluesky protocol was found to match its features such as ease of use to date, in terms of being able to substitute the site.
- Two studies demonstrated platform-built-in as well browser-integrated misinformation mitigation.
- Researchers developed falsity scores for over 800 contemporary elites on Twitter and associated exposure scores.
- News outlets reported the first fully self-supervised anti–money laundering AI software using contemporary suboptimal datasets, LaundroGraph.
- A university reported on the first study of the new privacy-intrusion Web tracking technique of "UID smuggling" by the ad industry, which finds it to be prevalent and largely not mitigated by the latest protection tools – such as Firefox's tracking protection and uBlock Origin – and contributes to countermeasures.
- Text-to-3D software became sophisticated, shortly after generative AI art. OpenAI released Point-E, a machine learning system that can generate 3D models from text prompts, similar to previously released GET3D and Magic3D by Nvidia. DreamFusion from Google may also be notable.

=== Hardware ===
- A logic gate for computation at femtosecond timescales was demonstrated.
- A study estimated losses of 61 metals to help the development of circular economy strategies, showing that usespans of, often scarce, tech-critical metals are short.
- Researchers reported a robotic finger covered in a type of manufactured living human skin. Researchers demonstrated an electronic skin giving biological skin-like haptic sensations and touch/pain-sensitivity to a robotic hand. A system of an electronic skin and a human-machine interface was reported that can enable remote sensed tactile perception, and wearable or robotic sensing of many hazardous substances and pathogens. A multilayer tactile sensor hydrogel-based robot skin was demonstrated.
- Samsung announced the first mass production of computer chips using a 3 nm process. These feature a gate-all-around transistor architecture that reduces power consumption by up to 45%, improves performance by 23% and reduces area by 16% compared to 5 nm.
- Researchers reported the development of nanoscale brain-inspired artificial synapses, using the ion proton (H^{+}), for 'analog deep learning'.
- The creation of artificial neurons that can receive and release dopamine (chemical signals rather than electrical signals) and communicate with natural rat muscle and brain cells was reported, with potential for use in BCIs/prosthetics.
- Scientists reported a so far unique and unknown feature of material VO_{2} – it can "remember" previous external stimuli (via structural rather than electronic states), with potential e.g. data storage.
- Researchers reported the development of remote controlled cyborg cockroaches functional if moving to sunlight for recharging.
- Researchers from the Max Planck Institute for Polymer Research reported an organic artificial spiking neuron for in-situ sensing and biointerface that exhibits the signal diversity of biological neurons.

== 2023 ==
=== AI ===
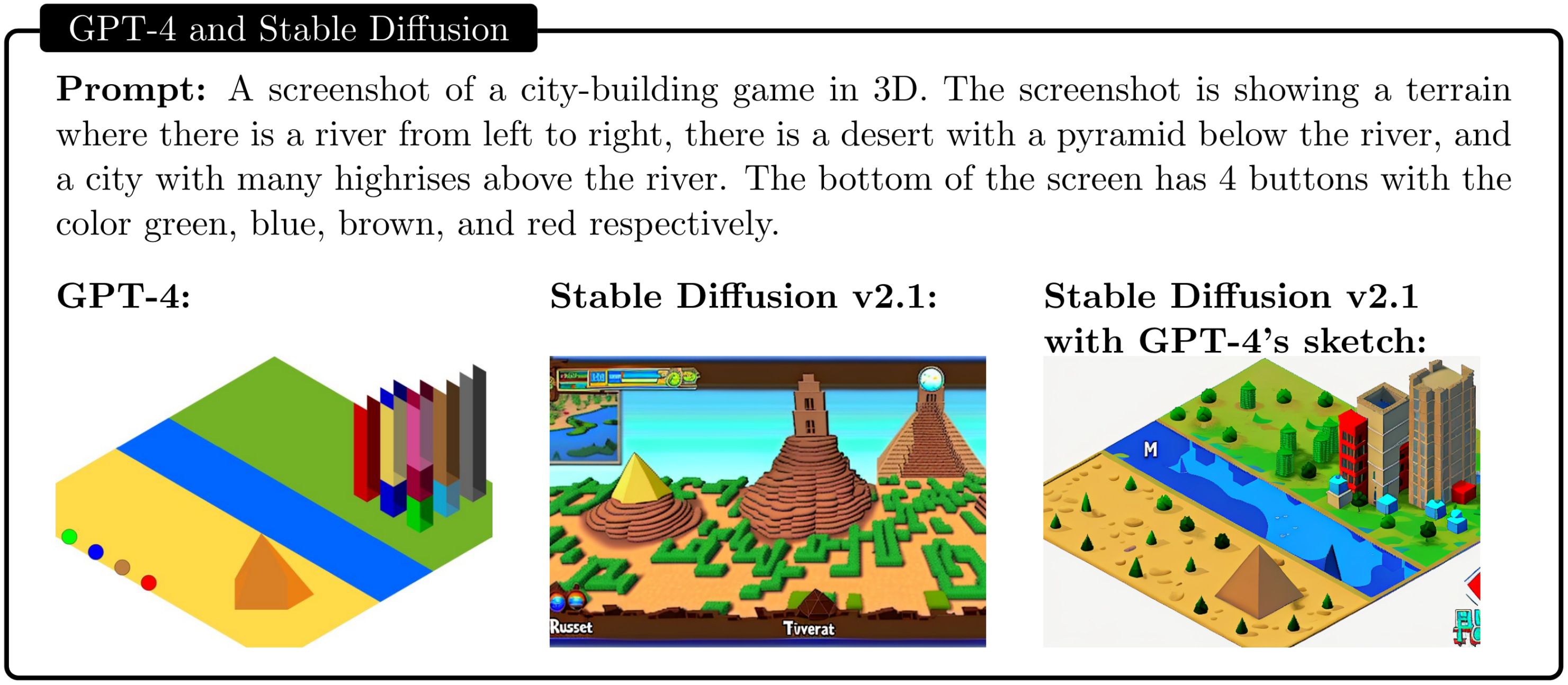
Combining GPT-4 and Stable Diffusion to generate art from sketches

- Chatbot and text-generating AI, ChatGPT (released on 30 Nov 2022), a large language model, became popular. It was estimated that only two months after its launch, it had 100 million active users. Applications may include enhancing the productivity of, or automating, large swathes of white collar work, including software development, finance, law, and education.
- Google released chatbot Bard due to effects of the ChatGPT release, with potential for integration into its Web search and, like ChatGPT software, also as a software development helper tool. DuckDuckGo released the DuckAssist feature integrated into its search engine that summarizes information from Wikipedia to answer search queries that are questions. The experimental feature was shut down without explanation on 12 April. There has been further development regarding LLMs or ChatGPT as user interfaces of Wikipedia or as software using its structured knowledge by others. It may demonstrate an alternative approach to ChatGPT whose fundamental algorithms are not designed to generate text that is true, including for example "hallucinations" and fake citations or misinformation more generally. Elicit.org may provide a free alternative to this tool. A broader alternative approach to the software's Q&A applications and use of text generation for assignments may be the improvement of media literacy and Web search skills in education systems.
- Further LLM developments during what has been called an "AI boom" included: local or open source versions of LLaMA which was leaked in March, news outlets reported on GPT4-based Auto-GPT that given natural language commands uses the Internet and other tools in attempts to understand and achieve its tasks with unclear or so-far little practicality, a systematic evaluation of answers from four "generative search engines" suggested their outputs "appear informative, but frequently contain unsupported statements and inaccurate citations", a multi-modal open source tool for understanding and generating speech, a data scientist argued that "researchers need to collaborate to develop open-source LLMs that are transparent" and independent, Stability AI launched an open source LLM.
- A method for editing NeRF scenes, a novel media technique from 2020, with natural language commands was demonstrated by Nvidia.
- An open letter "Pause Giant AI Experiments" initiated by the Future of Life Institute called for "AI labs to immediately pause for at least 6 months the training of AI systems more powerful than GPT-4" due to "profound risks to society and humanity". It received substantial media attention and also contributed to speculations about perceived large LLM potential). At the time there was extensive media coverage of views that regard ChatGPT as a potential step towards AGI or sentient machines, also extending to some academic works (e.g. a popular preprint by a company). The coverage focused on such views may not represent the majority expert views and, for example, some researchers noted that e.g. the ability to generate coherent text and imitations are not the same as understanding language. A set of techniques under development included self-refining code or text.
- ChatGPT was shown to outperform human doctors in responding to online medical questions when measured on quality and empathy by "a team of licensed health care professionals", albeit the chatbot may have previously been trained with these reddit question and answers threads.
- News outlets reported on a preprint that described the development of a large language model software that can answer medical questions with a 67.6% accuracy on MedQA and nearly matched human clinician performance when answering open-ended medical questions, Med-PaLM. The AI makes use of comprehension-, recall of knowledge-, and medical reasoning-algorithms but remains inferior to clinicians. As of 2023, humans often – if not most often – conduct query-based web searches, read websites and/or conduct physical doctor's visits to inquire health information, despite various difficulties, partly as they typically did not undergo any formal training in media literacy, digital literacy or health literacy, as such is not part of schools curricula in most education systems as of 2023.
- A novel potentially significantly more efficient text-to-image approach, as implemented in MUSE, was reported.
- A first successful autonomous long-duration operation, including simulated combat, of a modified F-16 fighter jet, X-62A, by two AI software was reported.
- A text-to-speech synthesizer, VALL-E, that can be trained to mimic anybody's voice with just three seconds of voice data and may produce the most natural-sounding results to date, was reported in a preprint.
- A use of world models for a wide range of domains that make decisions using e.g. different 3D worlds and reward frequencies and outperforms previous approaches, DreamerV3, was reported as a step towards general artificial intelligence in a preprint.
- A large language model, ProGen, that can generate functional protein sequences with a predictable function, with input including tags specifying protein properties, was reported.
- A deep-learning model, ZFDesign, for zinc finger design for any genomic target for gene- and epigenetic-editing was reported.
- Software for generating 3D dynamic scenes (text-to-4D), MAV3D, was reported.
- A study reported the development of deep learning algorithms to identify technosignature candidates, finding 8 potential alien signals not detected earlier.
- An international norms and arms control proposal for artificial intelligence in the military (such as LAWs and weapons decision-making), the "Political Declaration on Responsible Military Use of Artificial Intelligence and Autonomy]", was published by the U.S. government. The first international summit on military AI led to a joint unbinding statement by the U.S., China and other nations, with some external calls for starting negotiations on an internationally binding law or an enforcement-mechanisms-driven law.
- The world's first COVID-19 drug designed by generative AI was approved for human use, with clinical trials expected to begin in China. The new drug, ISM3312, was developed by Insilico Medicine.
- The LLM GPT-4 was launched by OpenAI. It and ChatGPT based on it continued to receive major global media attention.
- Researchers suggested that growing influence of industry in AI research means that "public interest alternatives for important AI tools may become increasingly scarce".
- Google revealed PaLM-E, an embodied multimodal language model with 562 billion parameters.

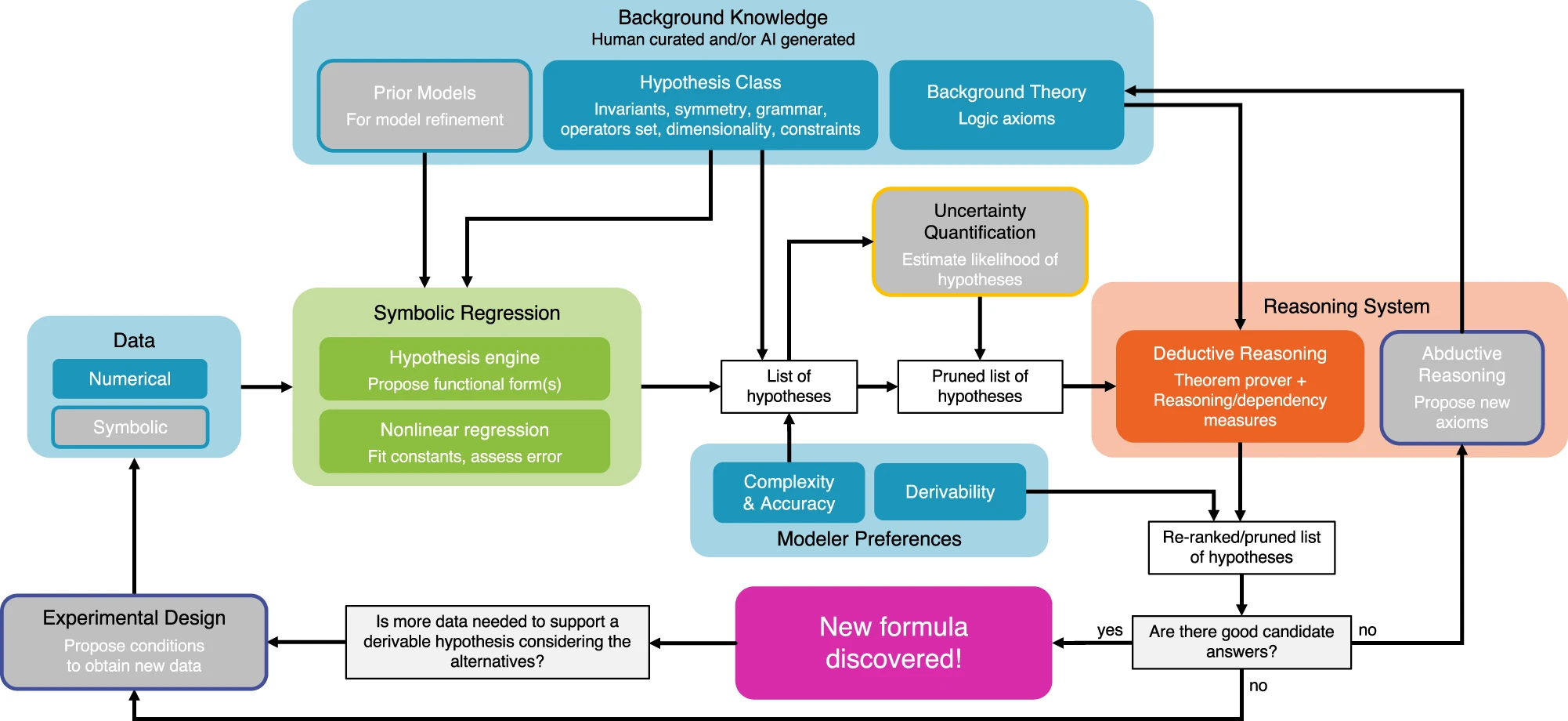
AI Descartes system overview

- Researchers demonstrated an open source 'AI scientist' that can create models of natural phenomena from knowledge axioms and experimental data, showing the software can rediscover physical laws like "Kepler's third law of planetary motion, Einstein's relativistic time-dilation law, and Langmuir's theory of adsorption" using logical reasoning and a few data points.

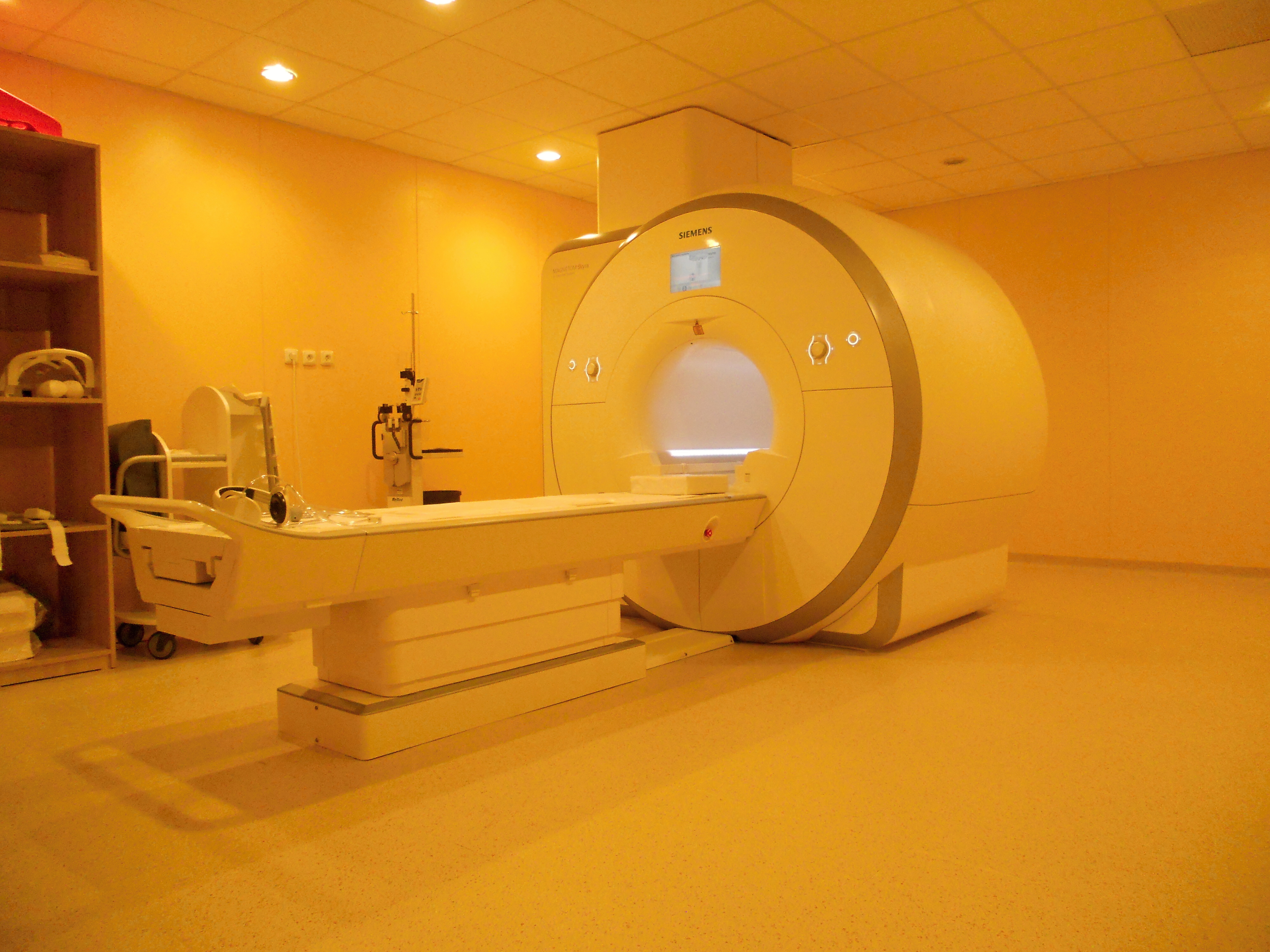
The fMRI machine used for brain-reading

- Researchers demonstrated a non-invasive brain-reading method. It can translate a person's neural activity into a continuous stream of text using fMRI data and transformer machine learning. Prior training data is required for this semantic decoding. Participants listened to stories for 16 hours while their brain activity was recorded.
- A new AI algorithm developed by Baidu was shown to boost the antibody response of COVID-19 mRNA vaccines by 128 times.

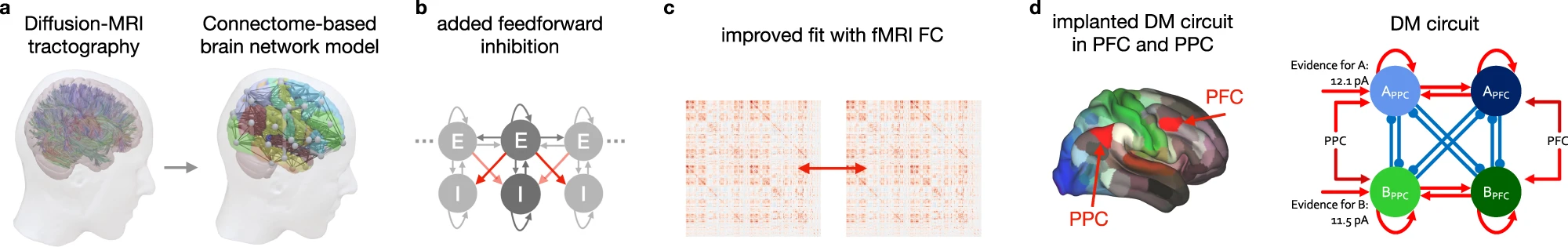
Outline of the study's open source virtual brain model

- Computational neuroscientists showed that people with higher intelligence scores in HCP cognitive tests took more time to solve difficult problems and that their higher synchrony between brain areas allowed for better integration of evidence (or progress) from preceding working memory sub-problem processing. Reducing synchrony in "avatar" simulations, that were adjusted and tuned towards personalization, "led decision-making circuits to quickly jump to conclusions". Their codified results may be useful for an understanding of cognition to replicate or imitate in bio-inspired computing.
- AI was used to develop an experimental antibiotic called abaucin, which is shown to be effective against A. baumannii.
- A machine learning model is trained to recognise the key features of chemicals with senolytic activity. It finds three chemicals – ginkgetin, periplocin and oleandrin – able to remove senescent cells without damaging healthy cells.
- Articles in science outlets like Nature suggest contemporary viral concerns about hypothetical existential risk of AI "plays into the tech companies' agenda" – partly in the form of 'criti-hype' – and that this "hinders effective regulation of the societal harms AI is causing right now" and in the near-future.
- A science writer provides an overview of "the nascent industry of AI-designed drugs".

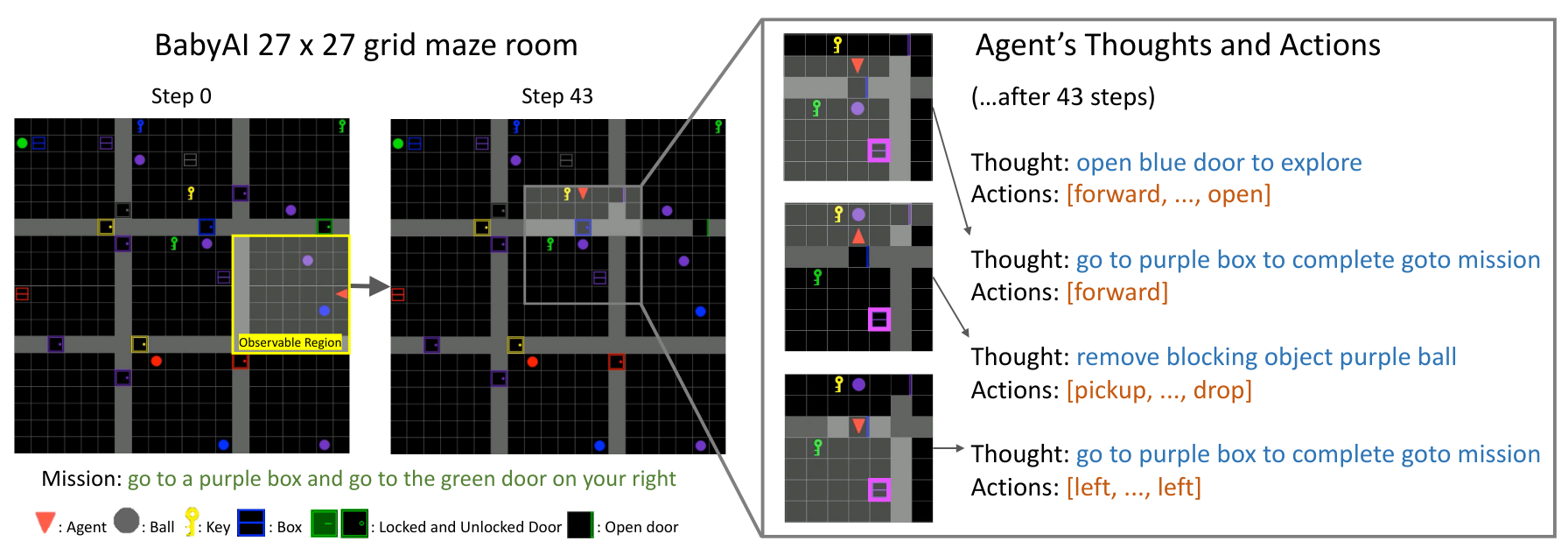
Illustration of "thought cloning"

- A preprint introduces the concept of "thought cloning" by which AI use data of or imitate human thinking.
- Metaresearchers showed that AI trained with study-author-networks data could generate scientifically promising "alien" hypotheses that would likely not be considered otherwise.
- A study provides an overview and living review of open source LLMs, assessing the levels of openness of their differentiated elements and reviewing the risks of relying on proprietary software or the importance of open source AI.

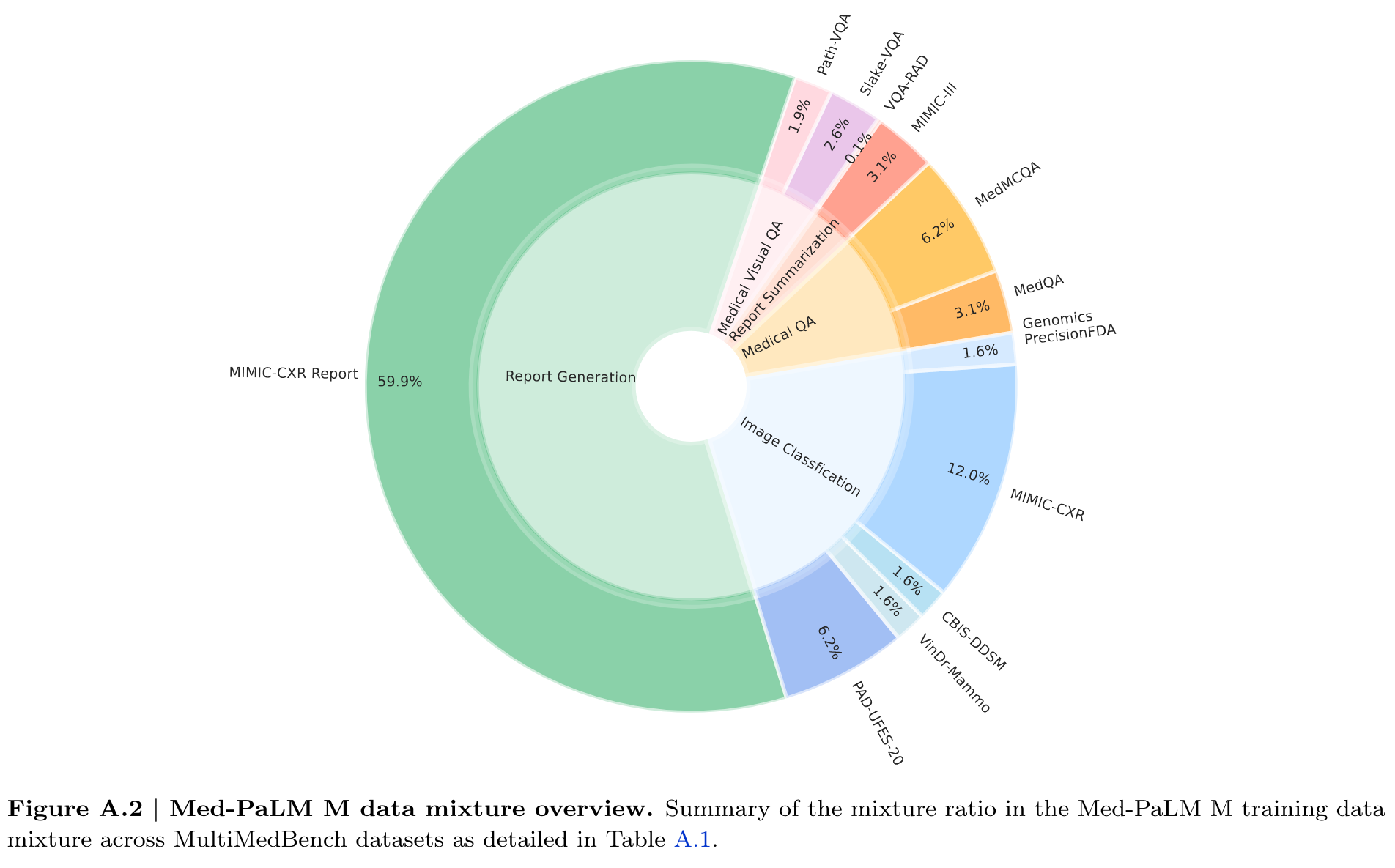
Summary of the Med-PaLM MMed-PaLM M training data

- AI-supported mammography screening was demonstrated to have the potential to substantially reduce workload and to possibly improve cancer detection rates.
- A review outlined applications and challenges of using AI to accelerate science.
- A study that won an international competition demonstrated an approach that predicted 70% of earthquakes, suggesting some form of earthquake prediction may be feasible in the future.
- Researchers released a large set of audiobooks for free books in Project Gutenberg created automatically via generative AI with near-natural voice.
- A natural language system was demonstrated that can provide explanations for the conclusion-making of machine learning models for explainable AI.
- A preprint reported some large language models have an 'extractable memorization' flaw by which training data can be extracted at affordable costs by queries.
- Google DeepMind announced its Gemini multimodal language model, which it claims has advanced "reasoning capabilities" and can outperform GPT-4 on a variety of tasks.
- A new class of antibiotic candidates, able to kill methicillin-resistant Staphylococcus aureus (MRSA) was identified using explainable deep learning.
- Notable innovation products: an open source automated experimentation science platform (BacterAI) for predicting microbial metabolism with little data, a low-cost smartphone-attachment (BPClip) for blood pressure measurement, an open source transfer learning-based system (Geneformer) for predicting how networks of interconnected human genes control or affect the function of cells, a performant open source AI software for protein design (RFdiffusion) was introduced, multimodal biomedical Med-PaLM M was introduced.

=== Software-hardware systems ===
- A two/multi-robot and beacons mesh communication paradigm for exploration by robotic probes, drones, spacecraft, disaster recovery rovers or underwater robots was reported.
- Researchers showed parrots can use and enjoy using a videocalling system.
- A 'chef' robot developed is trained to watch and learn from cooking videos, and recreate dishes itself.
- Autonomous drones won first races against human champions of FPV drone racing.

Robot arm R2 operation of the autonomous lab

- An autonomous laboratory for synthesis of inorganic powders, the A-Lab.
- Notable innovations: a low-cost open source air pollution sensor (Flatburn), a laser-using drone-based methane plume localization method, and a portable EEG helmet with significant accuracy of decoding thought words to text (DeWave).

=== Software ===
- Researchers demonstrated how pre-installed apps on Android smartphones in China are used for mass surveillance in China.
- Scientists reviewed safety-by-design technology- and policy-based approaches to ensure biosafety and biosecurity to prevent engineered pathogen pandemics, including digital methods such as DNA sequence screening, some of which are already implemented and part of regulations to some degree.
- Studies investigated dating apps, revealing high gender inequality, partly exploring possible relevance to the rise of both "sexual loneliness" and concentration of sex in various developed countries, and reported subsets of well-being effects.
- A study hypothesized mental health awareness efforts (in current forms) or glamorised and romanticised mental disorders on social media (e.g. quotes about depression on aesthetically appealing backgrounds shared widely on certain social media) may have contributed to the recent rise in reported mental health problems – by intensifying and over-diagnosing of such – beyond e.g. increased reporting of previously under-recognised symptoms or mental health-related issues.
- A news outlet reported on a systematic study of major issues in popular currently available commercial VPNs for Internet privacy and security.
- Researchers reported 'digital resignation', calling for regulations and education reform.
- Parts of Twitter's recommender algorithms became open source, welcomed and requested by many albeit with several issues related to code exclusion and verifiability. Around the time, the free version of its API, which was also used for research, was shut down – followed shortly thereafter by reddit, proprietary verification checkmarks caused controversy, parts of its source code were leaked, and applications of a "state-affiliated media" label – which purportedly uses "Category:Publicly funded broadcasters" data which, like the label, does not differentiate and list the shares of funding sources – caused controversy. In April, Twitter was warned by EU digital policy-makers after a report indicated its recent policies "boost" Russian disinformation-based propaganda.
- One of the first empirical studies on what real users are shown during their typical use of popular Web search engines interpreted its results to show that choices for unreliable news sources for their queries are driven primarily by users' own choices and less by the engine's algorithms. The Web scientists linked their findings to the concept of filter bubbles which emphasizes the role of design- and personalization algorithms. A report accompanied by an open letter concluded that Alphabet Inc, against its voluntary promises, still runs climate misinformation ads. Statements by Elon Musk in 2022 suggested YouTube may also show ethically disputed advertising other than science-related misinformation such as extensively showing "scam ads".
- An umbrella review summarized the research on benefits and risks associated with digital media use by youths, suggesting caregivers, policymakers and researchers should continue to move away from prevailing oversimplified recommendations to reduce screen time to instead focus on distinguished types of screen use.

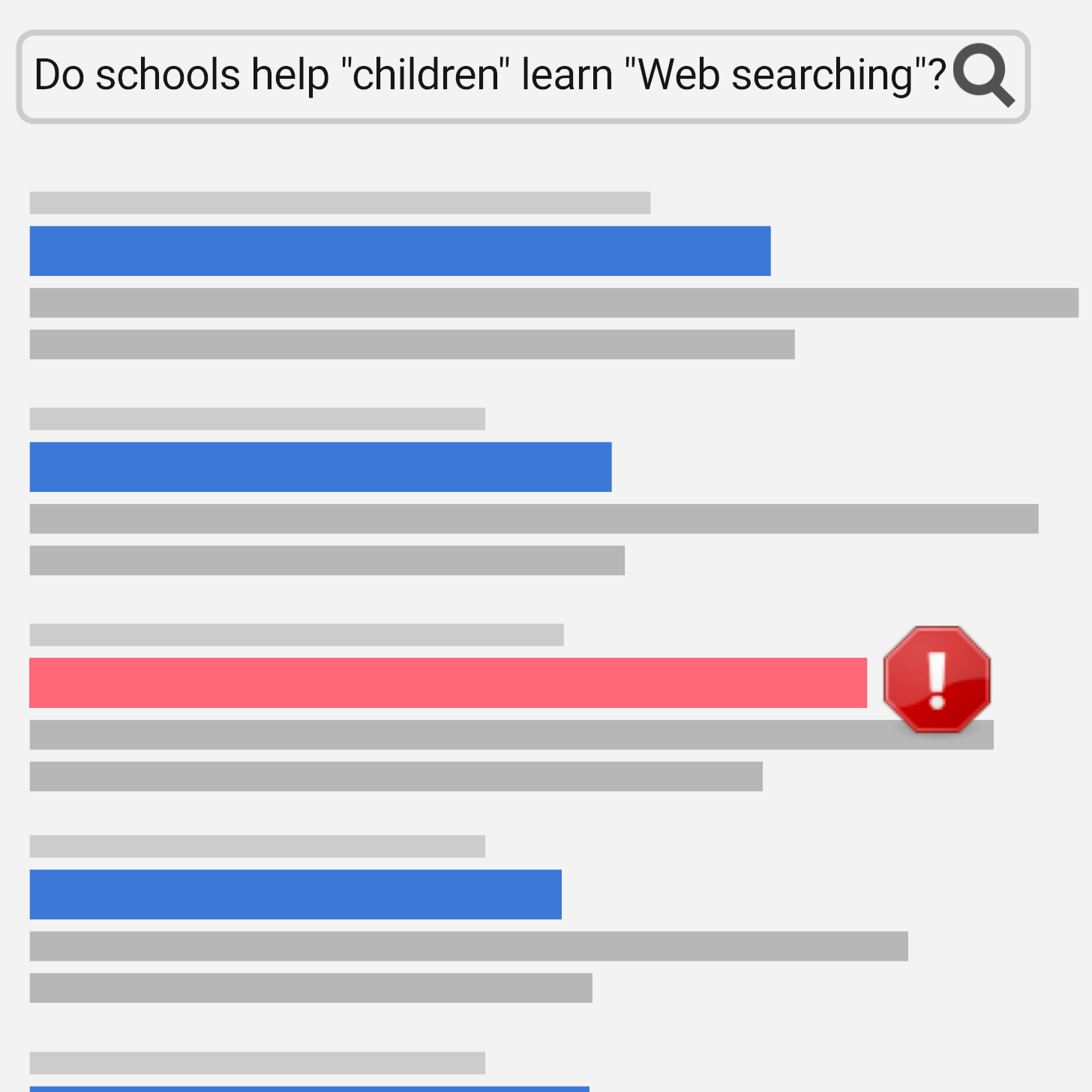
An experiment suggests people and search engines often fail in online searches for evaluating misinformation.

- An experimental study reported online search to evaluate the truthfulness of false news articles increased the probability of believing them, especially for those for whom search engines return lower-quality information. It suggests media literacy programs with tested strategies and solutions for identified search engines issues are needed.
- The concept of enshittification about the quality of content on social media platforms introduced in 2022 gained traction.
- Notable innovations: a Tor browser-equivalent Web browser for privacy-protected browsing when using a VPN (Mullvad browser) was demonstrated, after moderators of the Web content aggregation-based platform Reddit strike against the site's introduction of API pricing and the ensuing closing of several mobile client apps, several novel decentralized open source aggregation platforms gain substantial numbers of users – most notably Lemmy and Kbin which can synchronize their posts via interoperability, the first upgrade of the Global Earthquake Model data for disaster risk reduction, and the misinformation-countering system Community Notes became relatively widely used on X (formerly Twitter).

=== Hardware and wetware ===
- Researchers demonstrated an open-brain surgery-free brain implant, Stentrode, that can record brain activity from a nearby blood vessel, showing it can be used to operate a computer.
- News outlets reported on a study (21 Nov. 2022) demonstrating locust antennae implanted as biosensors into (bio-hybrid) robots for AI-interpreted machine olfaction.

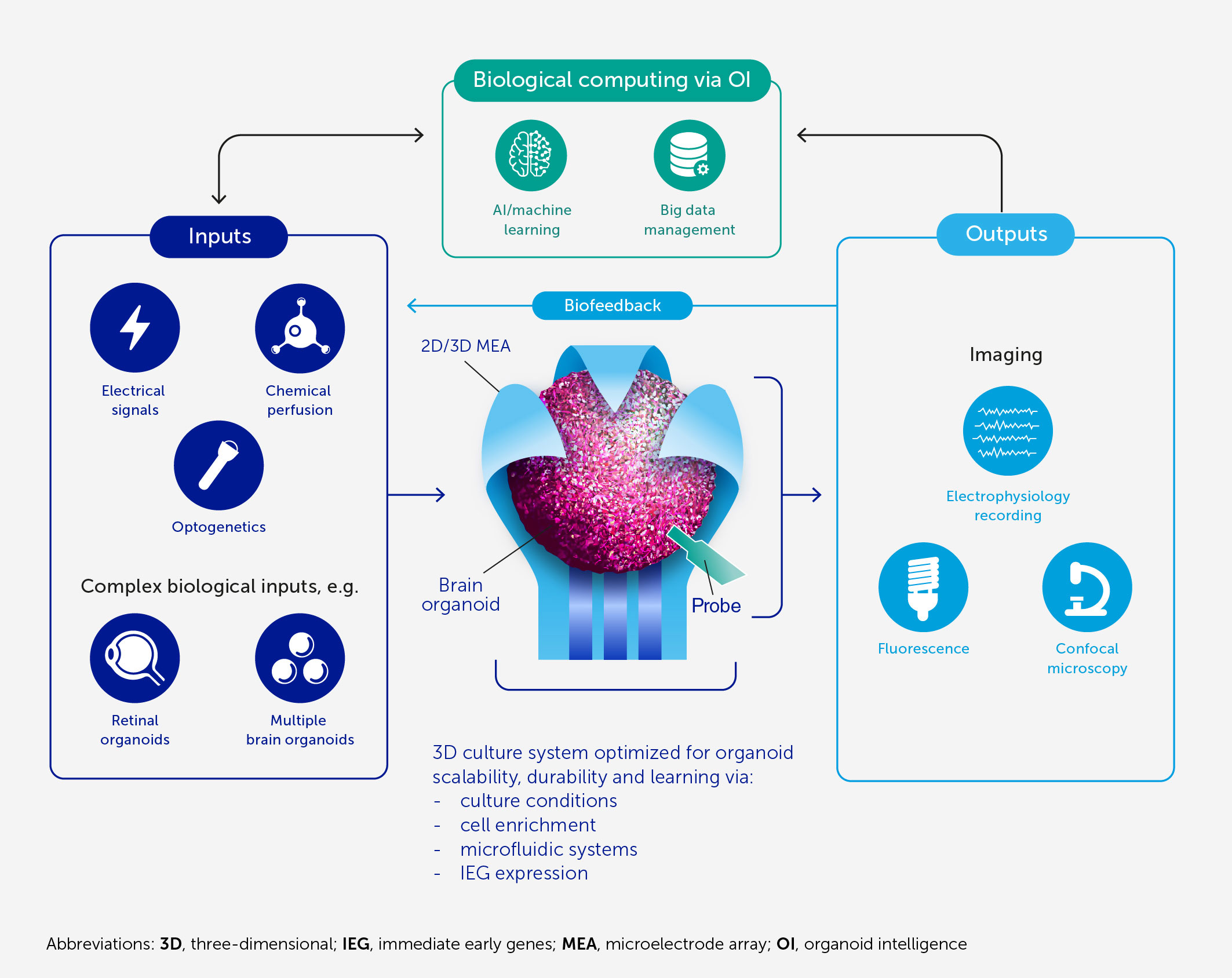
Scientists coin and outline a new field 'organoid intelligence' (OI).

- Scientists coalesced recent developments using human brain organoids into a new field they term organoid intelligence (OI), seeking to harness OI for computing – as a novel type of AI – in an ethically responsible way. Networks of such miniature tissues could become functional using stimulus-response training or organoid-computer interfaces – to potentially become "more powerful than silicon-based computing" for a range of tasks – and could also be used for research of various pathophysiologies, brain development, human learning, memory and intelligence, and new therapeutic approaches against brain diseases.
- Biological organoid intelligence, 'Brainoware', was demonstrated to solve computational tasks in a preprint, with implications for bioethics and potential bottlenecks and limits of nonbio-AI.
- A study demonstrated functional integration of a magnetically steered microbot containing neurons, 'Mag-Neurobot', in a mouse "organotypic hippocampal slice" as physical (semi-) artificial neurons.
- Researchers reported the development of a fuel cell implant powered by blood glucose. It can also release insulin at certain levels and have enough energy to allow smartphone implant control.

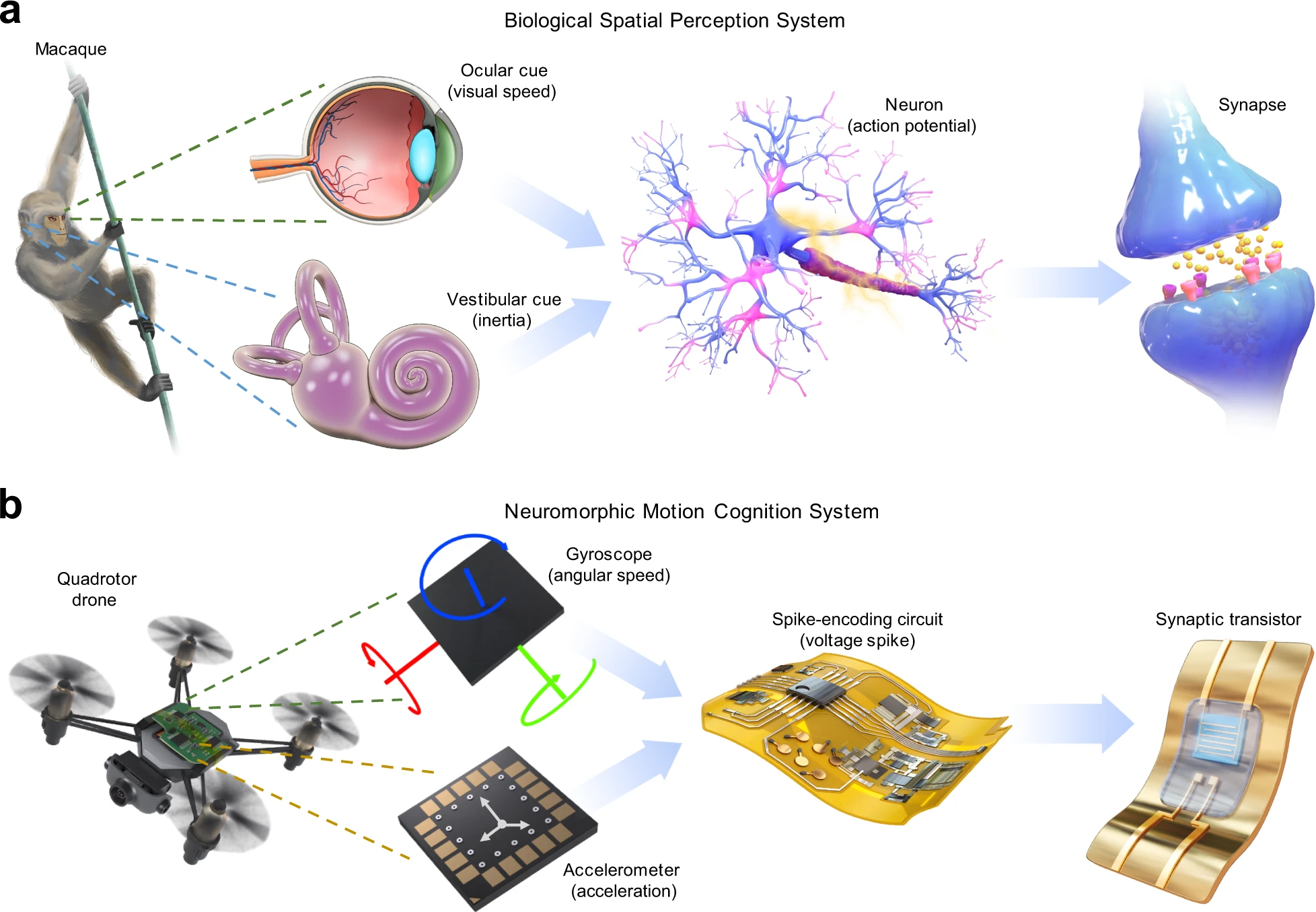
Bioinspired neuromorphic motion-cognition nerve in comparison with an ocular-vestibular cross-modal sensory nerve of macaques

- Researchers reported the development of neuromorphic AI hardware using nanowires physically mimicking the brain's activity in identifying and remembering an image from memory. A university reported on a demonstration of multisensory motion cue integration by a neuromorphic nerve for robots.

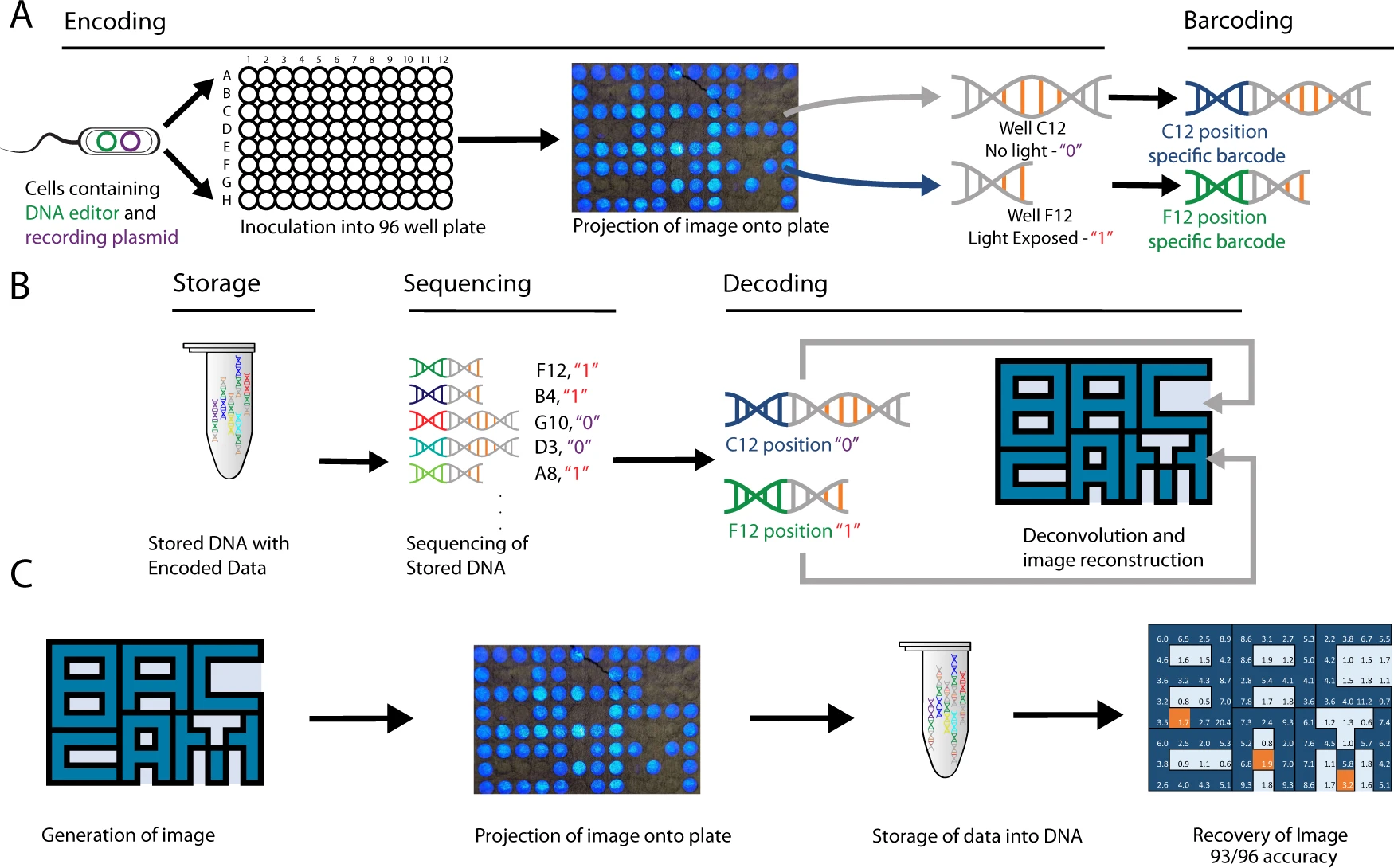
"BacCam" demonstrates encoding and storing data into bacterial DNA without new DNA synthesis by recording light exposure.

- Researchers demonstrated encoding and storing data – small images – as DNA without new DNA synthesis by recording light exposure into bacterial DNA via optogenetic circuits. The 'biological camera' extends chemical and electrical interface techniques.
- Researchers demonstrated the use of biological-electronic hybrid Organoid Intelligence, 'Brainoware', for speech recognition.

== 2024 ==
=== AI ===
- An AI-based study shows for the first time that fingerprints from different fingers of the same person share strong detectable similarities.
- A preprint trial suggests large language models could be used for tailored manipulation, being more persuasive than humans when using personal information.
- Notable innovations: LAION releases a first version of BUD-E, a fully open source voice assistant, an automatic waste sorting system that can distinguish between over 500 waste categories is released, researchers describe an AI ecosystem interface of foundation models connected to many APIs as specialized subtask-solvers, the chatbot Grok is made open source to a substantial extent.
- John Hopfield and Geoffrey Hinton win the Nobel Prize in Physics "for foundational discoveries and inventions that enable machine learning with artificial neural networks"

=== Hardware ===
- Researchers describe an approach for an optical disk with petabit capacity,

=== Internet penetration ===
- According to the International Telecommunication Union, the global Internet population reached 5.5 billion in 2024, meaning more than two-thirds of the world's population is now online.

== 2025 ==
- On January 14, the New York Times, The New York Daily News, and the Center of Investigative Reporting have a hearing in a combined lawsuit against OpenAI.
- OpenAI develops a model called "GPT 4b-micro", which suggests ways that protein factors could be re-engineered to become more effective.
- DeepSeek releases DeepSeek-R1 on 20 January, a large language model based on DeepSeek-V3 utilising a chain-of-thought process similar to OpenAI o1.
- On May 18, 2025, 15 launches 15.dev as the successor to 15.ai. (Note: @fifteenai (May 18, 2025). "We are so back. https://15.dev Only MLP characters for now. More characters, features, and improvements will be added soon. Check Twitter and/or the Discord server (linked on the website) for updates! (Expect possible downtime as I calibrate server capacity and GPU allocations depending on how busy the website gets.)" (Tweet) – via X (formerly Twitter).)
- The race for the most advanced AI continues, with new models like OpenAI GPT-5.1 release and reports of SoftBank selling its Nvidia stake to double down on Open AI bets.
- In November, a supply shortage in semiconductor memory begins, marked by significant price increases in consumer DRAM components.

== 2026 ==
- On January 5th, Nvidia announces the "Rubin" platform at CES 2026, its first extreme-codesigned six-chip AI architecture (CPU, GPU, DPU, NIC, NVLink, and Ethernet switching) and successor to Blackwell. The Rubin GPU features a third-generation Transformer Engine delivering 50 petaflops of NVFP4 compute for AI inference, and the platform is declared to be in full production.
- On January 5th, Intel launches its Core Ultra Series 3 ("Panther Lake") processors at CES 2026, the first client compute platform built on Intel's 18A process node — the most advanced semiconductor process developed and manufactured in the United States — powering over 200 PC designs.
- On February 2nd, SpaceX acquires xAI in an all-stock transaction that makes xAI a wholly owned subsidiary of SpaceX, combining the two Elon Musk–led companies' AI, rocket, satellite-internet, and media businesses under one roof.
- On March 11th, Google completes its acquisition of cloud and AI security firm Wiz for approximately $32 billion in cash — the largest acquisition in Google's history — integrating Wiz into Google Cloud while retaining the Wiz brand.
- On May 25th, Pope Leo XIV releases Magnifica humanitas, an encyclical about the risks of AI and how humanity can be safeguarded against those risks.
- On June 8th, Apple holds WWDC26, unveiling the next generation of Apple Intelligence and a redesigned "Siri AI," along with iOS 27, macOS 27, and other platform updates. The keynote is the last WWDC appearance of CEO Tim Cook before his handover to hardware chief John Ternus on September 1.
- On June 25th, IBM announces a breakthrough in "sub-1 nanometer" semiconductor technology. It features a new architecture at the 0.7 nm node, called "nanostack," which is the first three-dimensional architectural design based on nanosheets. The design stacks approximately 100 billion transistors vertically to overcome physical limitations in small-scale semiconductors.
- On July 21st, Google releases three new Gemini models, including Gemini 3.6 Flash — described as its most powerful Flash model — and Gemini 3.5 Flash Cyber, a cybersecurity-specialized model.
- On July 24th, the European Union publishes the "Digital Omnibus" amendments to the EU AI Act in the Official Journal (effective July 27th), which defer the applicability of the high-risk AI system obligations originally scheduled for August 2, 2026, and add new prohibited AI categories.

== Awards and challenges ==
Award / challenge	Year	Recipient/s / winner/s	Description
FSF Free Software Awards – Advancement of Free Software award	2020	Bradley M. Kuhn	For his work in enforcing the GNU General Public License (GPL) and promoting copyleft through his position at Software Freedom Conservancy.
FSF Free Software Awards – Advancement of Free Software award	2021	Paul Eggert	A computer scientist who teaches in the Department of Computer Science at the University of California, Los Angeles, contributor to the GNU operating system for over thirty years and current maintainer of the Time Zone Database.
FSF Free Software Awards – Social benefit award	2020	CiviCRM	Free program that nonprofit organizations around the world use to manage their mailings and contact databases
FSF Free Software Awards – Social benefit award	2021	SecuRepairs	An association of information security experts who support the right to repair
FSF Free Software Awards – Award for outstanding new Free Software contributor	2020	Alyssa Rosenzweig	Leads the Panfrost project, a project to reverse engineer and implement a free driver for the Mali series of graphics processing units (GPUs) used on a wide variety of single-board computers and mobile phones.
FSF Free Software Awards – Award for outstanding new Free Software contributor	2021	Protesilaos Stavrou	A philosopher who since 2019 has become a mainstay of the GNU Emacs community through his blog posts, conference talks, livestreams, and code contributions.

== Digital policy ==
- In 2024, the European Union approved the Artificial Intelligence Act.
- In 2024, the European Union approved the Cyber Resilience Act.

== Deaths ==
=== 2020 ===
- January 2: Robert M. Graham, American computer scientist (b. 1929)
- January 3: Joseph Karr O'Connor, American computer scientist (b. 1953)
- January 8: Peter T. Kirstein, British computer scientist (b. 1933)
- February 11: Yasumasa Kanada, Japanese computer scientist (b. 1949)
- February 16:
  - Larry Tesler, American computer scientist (b. 1945)
  - John Iliffe, British computer designer (b. 1931)
- February 18: Bert Sutherland, American computer scientist (b. 1936)
- March 2: Vera Pless, American mathematician (b. 1931)
- March 15: Olvi L. Mangasarian, Iraqi-American computer scientist and mathematician (b. 1934)
- April 7
  - Mishik Kazaryan, Russian physicist (b. 1948)
  - Adrian V. Stokes, British computer scientist (b. 1945)
- April 11: John Horton Conway, British mathematician (b. 1937)
- April 25: Thomas Huang, American computer scientist (b. 1936)
- May 9: Timo Honkela, Finnish computer scientist (b. 1962)
- June 5: Deborah Washington Brown, American computer scientist (b. 1952)
- July 10: Michael M. Richter, German mathematician and computer scientist (b. 1938)
- July 26: Bill English, American computer engineer and co-developer of the computer mouse (b. 1929)
- August 4: Frances Allen, American computer scientist, first woman to win the Turing Award (b. 1932)
- August 11: Russell Kirsch, American computer scientist and inventor of the first digital image scanner (b. 1929)
- August 25: Rebeca Guber, Argentine mathematician and computer scientist (b.1926)
- October 2: Victor Zalgaller, Russian-Israeli mathematician (b. 1920)
- November 7: Chung Laung Liu, Taiwanese computer scientist (b. 1934)
- November 14: Peter Pagé, German computer scientist (b. 1939)
- November 23: Konrad Fiałkowski, Polish computer engineer (b. 1939)
- December 1
  - Norman Abramson, American computer scientist and engineer (b. 1932)
  - Eric Engstrom, American software engineer and co-creator of DirectX (b. 1965)
- December 14: Claudio Baiocchi, Italian mathematician (b. 1940)
- December 22: Edmund M. Clarke, American computer scientist (b. 1945)
- December 23: Lars Arge, Danish computer scientist (b. 1967)

=== 2021 ===
- January 2: Brad Cox, American computer scientist, and inventor of the Objective-C programming language (b. 1944)
- January 28: Alice Recoque, French computer scientist (b. 1929)
- February 1: Walter Savitch, American computer scientist and theoretical mathematician (b. 1943)
- February 6: Ioan Dzițac, Romanian computer scientist and mathematician (b. 1953)
- March 6: Lou Ottens, Dutch engineer and inventor of the cassette tape (b. 1926)
- April 1: Isamu Akasaki, Japanese engineer and physicist, and inventor of the blue LED (b. 1929)
- April 16: Charles Geschke, American computer scientist, and co-founder of Adobe Inc. (b. 1939)
- April 23: Dan Kaminsky, American computer security researcher (b. 1979)
- May 23: Makoto Nagao, Japanese natural language processing pioneer (b. 1936)
- June 23: John McAfee, British-American antivirus software pioneer, and founder of McAfee (b. 1945)

=== 2022 ===
- January 2: Hagit Shatkay, 56, Israeli-American computer scientist
- January 30: Takao Nishizeki, 74, Japanese mathematician and computer scientist
- February 16: Lorinda Cherry, 77, American computer scientist and programmer
- February 28: Mary Coombs, 93, British computer programmer
- September 2: Peter Eckersley, 43, Australian computer scientist

=== 2023 ===
- March 24: Gordon Moore, 94, American businessman, engineer, and co-founder of Intel Corporation
- May 5: Ian Witten, 76, English-New Zealand computer scientist, co-creator of the Sequitur algorithm, Fellow of the Royal Society of New Zealand (b. 1947).

=== 2024 ===
- February 2: John Walker, 74, American computer programmer, author and co-founder of Autodesk
- April 23: Robert H. Dennard, 91, American electrical engineer and inventor of DRAM
- May 17: Gordon Bell, 89, American electrical engineer and manager
- June 9: Lynn Conway, 86, American computer scientist, electrical engineer, known for Mead–Conway VLSI chip design revolution
- August 9: Susan Wojcicki, 56, American business executive, CEO of YouTube
- November 12: Thomas E. Kurtz, 96, American computer scientist and educator

=== 2025 ===
- February 12: Cordell Green, 83, American computer scientist and pioneer of logic programming, founder of the Kestrel Institute
- June 5: Bill Atkinson, 74, American computer scientist known for his work at Apple Computer and for creating HyperCard

=== 2026 ===
- February 15: Paul Brainerd, 78, American businessman and programmer, founder of Aldus Corporation
- March 5: Tony Hoare, 92, British computer scientist
- May 17: Peter G. Neumann, 93, American computer science and security researcher and founder of the Cheri computer security project

== Further topics ==
Very broad outlines of topic domains and topics with substantial progress during the decade not yet included above with a Further information: link:

- Applications of wearable technology
- Recent applications of automation
- Smart grid#Research
- R&D of novel machine-readable media
- Digital literacy
- AI literacy
- Remote sensing
  - Category:Earth observation platforms
- Digital agriculture
  - Precision agriculture#Emerging technologies
- Precision medicine
- Remote control animal
- Electronic health record
- Neurotechnology#Implants
- Neuromorphic engineering
- Research question#ICTs, participation and routine procedures
- Category:Free BIOS implementations
- List of open-source hardware
- Information and communications technology
- List of unsolved problems in computer science
- Outline of finance
- Outline of public relations
- Outline of computing

=== Software ===
- Applications of artificial intelligence
  - Argumentation theory#Artificial intelligence
  - Explainable artificial intelligence
  - Artificial intelligence art
- Climate change mitigation#Research
- Education#Development
- Archivist#On the Internet
- Decision-making software
- Emulator
  - Video game console emulator
- Technical standard
- Supply chain sustainability#Software
  - Sustainability standards and certification
- Linux for mobile devices
- Usage share of operating systems

=== COVID-19 ===
- Impact of the COVID-19 pandemic on education
  - Learning management system#COVID-19 and learning management systems
- Impact of the COVID-19 pandemic on science and technology
- Software for COVID-19 pandemic mitigation

=== Economic events and economics ===
- 2020–2023 global chip shortage
- 2025–present global memory supply shortage
- Cryptocurrency bubble#2020–2022 cryptocurrency bubble
- Bug bounty program#Notable programs
- China–United States trade war#2020 or general technological sovereignty policies

General topics

- Business models for open-source software#FOSS and economy
- Digital transformation#History
- Distributive justice
- Sustainable distribution
- Sustainable design
- Algorithms for resource allocation
- Sustainable food system decision-making
- 2020s in economic history#Remote work

== See also ==
- Moore's law#Recent trends
- Smartphone#Other developments in the 2020s
- Smartwatch#2020s
- Timeline of quantum computing and communication#2020s
- Timeline of free and open-source software#2020s
  - Firefox version history
  - History of Linux
    - Timeline of Linux adoption
    - Linux gaming#2017-present
- Timeline of social media
- Timeline of file sharing#2010s
- Timeline of e-commerce
- Timeline of transportation technology#Autonomous vehicles
- Timeline of WhatsApp
- Timeline of programming languages#2020s
- Timeline of machine learning
- Timeline of hypertext technology
- Timeline of artificial intelligence
- History of supercomputing
  - TOP500#TOP 500
- History of Wikipedia
