= Department of Defense Directive 3000.09 =

US policy on autonomous weapons

Department of Defense Directive 3000.09 (DODD 3000.09), titled Autonomy in Weapon Systems, is the current U.S. military policy on autonomous weapons. It states: "Autonomous and semi-autonomous weapon systems will be designed to allow commanders and operators to exercise appropriate levels of human judgment over the use of force."

== History ==
Then-Deputy Secretary of Defense Ashton Carter issued DOD's policy on autonomy in weapons systems, Department of Defense Directive (DODD) 3000.09, in November 2012. DOD updated the directive in January 2023. In February 2023, the US issued a related foreign policy proposal, Political Declaration on Responsible Military Use of Artificial Intelligence and Autonomy.

== Definitions ==
There is no agreed definition of lethal autonomous weapon systems that is used in international fora. However, DODD 3000.09 provides definitions for different categories of autonomous weapon systems for the purposes of the U.S. military. These definitions are principally grounded in the role of the human operator with regard to target selection and engagement decisions, rather than in the technological sophistication of the weapon system.

DODD 3000.09 defines LAWS as "weapon system[s] that, once activated, can select and engage targets without further intervention by a human operator." This concept of autonomy is also known as "human out of the loop" or "full autonomy." The directive contrasts LAWS with human-supervised, or "human on the loop," autonomous weapon systems, in which operators have the ability to monitor and halt a weapon's target engagement. Another category is semi-autonomous, or "human in the loop," weapon systems that "only engage individual targets or specific target groups that have been selected by a human operator." Semi-autonomous weapons include so-called "fire and forget" weapons, such as certain types of guided missiles, that deliver effects to human-identified targets using autonomous functions.

The directive does not apply to autonomous or semi-autonomous cyberspace capabilities; unarmed platforms; unguided munitions; munitions manually guided by the operator (e.g., laser- or wire-guided munitions); mines; unexploded explosive ordnance; or autonomous or semi-autonomous systems that are not weapon systems, nor subject them to its guidelines.

== Role of human operator ==
DODD 3000.09 requires that all systems, including LAWS, be designed to "allow commanders and operators to exercise appropriate levels of human judgment over the use of force." As noted in an August 2018 U.S. government white paper, "'appropriate' is a flexible term that reflects the fact that there is not a fixed, one-size-fits-all level of human judgment that should be applied to every context. What is 'appropriate' can differ across weapon systems, domains of warfare, types of warfare, operational contexts, and even across different functions in a weapon system."

Furthermore, "human judgment over the use of force" does not require manual human "control" of the weapon system, as is often reported, but rather broader human involvement in decisions about how, when, where, and why the weapon will be employed. This includes a human determination that the weapon will be used "with appropriate care and in accordance with the law of war, applicable treaties, weapon system safety rules, and applicable rules of engagement."

To aid this determination, DODD 3000.09 requires that "[a]dequate training, [tactics, techniques, and procedures], and doctrine are available, periodically reviewed, and used by system operators and commanders to understand the functioning, capabilities, and limitations of the system's autonomy in realistic operational conditions." The directive also requires that the weapon's human-machine interface be "readily understandable to trained operators" so they can make informed decisions regarding the weapon's use.

== Weapons review process ==
DODD 3000.09 requires that the software and hardware of covered semi-autonomous and autonomous weapon systems, be tested and evaluated to ensure they:

Function as anticipated in realistic operational environments against adaptive adversaries taking realistic and practicable countermeasures, [and] complete engagements within a timeframe and geographic area, as well as other relevant environmental and operational constraints, consistent with commander and operator intentions. If unable to do so, the systems will terminate the engagement or obtain additional operator input before continuing the engagement.

Systems must also be "sufficiently robust to minimize the probability and consequences of failures." Any changes to the system's operating state—for example, due to machine learning—would require the system to go through testing and evaluation again to ensure that it has retained its safety features and ability to operate as intended. The directive also notes that "the use of AI capabilities in autonomous or semi-autonomous systems will be consistent with the DOD AI Ethical Principles."

In addition to the standard weapons review process, a secondary senior-level review is required for covered autonomous and semi-autonomous systems. This review requires the Under Secretary of Defense for Policy (USD[P]), the vice chairman of the Joint Chiefs of Staff (VCJCS), and the Under Secretary of Defense for Research and Engineering (USD[R&E]) to approve the system before formal development. USD(P), VCJCS, and the Under Secretary of Defense for Acquisition and Sustainment (USD[A&S]) must then approve the system before fielding. In the event of "urgent military need," this senior-level review may be waived by the Deputy Secretary of Defense. DODD 3000.09 additionally establishes the Autonomous Weapon System Working Group—composed of representatives of USD(P); USD(R&E); USD(A&S); DOD General Counsel; the Chief Digital and AI Officer; the Director, Operational Test and Evaluation; and the chairman of the Joint Chiefs of Staff—to support and advise the senior-level review process.

== Congressional notification ==
Per Section 251 of the FY2024 National Defense Authorization Act (NDAA; Pub. L. 118–31 (text) (PDF)), the Secretary of Defense is to notify the defense committees of any changes to DODD 3000.09 within 30 days. The Secretary is directed to provide a description of the modification and an explanation of the reasons for the modification. Section 1066 of the FY2025 NDAA (Pub. L. 118–159 (text) (PDF)) additionally requires the Secretary to "submit to the congressional defense committees a comprehensive report on the approval and deployment of lethal autonomous weapon systems by the United States," annually through December 31, 2029. Section 1061 of the FY2026 NDAA (P.L. Pub. L. 119–60 (menu; GPO has not yet published law)) amends the U.S. Code to require congressional notification of any waiver issued under DODD 3000.09.

== AI safety ==
The second revision of DoDD 3000.09, effective January 25, 2023, requires that "The DoD will design and engineer AI capabilities to fulfill their intended functions while possessing the ability to detect and avoid unintended consequences, and the ability to disengage or deactivate deployed systems that demonstrate unintended behavior."

== Criticism ==
As noted in the Bulletin of the Atomic Scientists, the policy requires that autonomous weapon systems that kill people or use kinetic force, selecting and engaging targets without further human intervention, be certified as compliant with "appropriate levels" and other standards, not that such weapon systems cannot meet these standards and are therefore forbidden. "Semi-autonomous" hunter-killers that autonomously identify and attack targets do not require certification.

== See also ==
- Use of artificial intelligence by the United States Department of Defense
