= Political Declaration on Responsible Military Use of Artificial Intelligence and Autonomy =

American arms control proposal

The Political Declaration on Responsible Military Use of Artificial Intelligence and Autonomy is an international norms and arms control proposal by the U.S. government for artificial intelligence in the military.

It was announced at the Summit on Responsible Artificial Intelligence in the Military Domain (REAIM) by Bonnie Jenkins, Under Secretary of State for Arms Control. As of the last update 27 November 2024, 58 countries are signatories to the declaration. The US government sees it as an extension of the Department of Defense Directive 3000.09 which is the current US policy on autonomous weapons. It covers areas such as lethal autonomous weapons and weapons decision-making.

A similar but different competing agreement, REAIM 2023 Call to Action, was signed by 57 states on 16 February 2023.
