= Summit on Responsible Artificial Intelligence in the Military Domain =

Annual diplomatic summit first held in 2023

The Summit on Responsible Artificial Intelligence in the Military Domain, also known as REAIM Summit, is an annual diplomatic conference held regarding military uses of artificial intelligence. The first summit, REAIM 2023, was held in 2023 at the World Forum in The Hague on 15–16 February 2023.

Sixty countries participated, including the US and China, but not Russia. The summit concluded with the production of a non-binding "call to action" document, endorsed by representatives from 60 countries including Russia and China. There were some external calls for starting negotiations on an internationally binding law or an enforcement mechanisms-driven law.

The US proposed a Political Declaration on Responsible Military Use of Artificial Intelligence and Autonomy.

A second summit was held in Seoul, South Korea, between the 9th and 10th of September 2024.

The third summit was held in A Coruña, Spain from 4 to 5 February 2026.

The fourth summit, REAIM IV, will be held in Kenya on 14 and 15 April 2027.
