= Hagit Shatkay =

American computer scientist (1965–2022)

- חגית שטקי
- Born: January 28, 1965; Petah Tikva, Israel
- Died: January 2, 2022 (aged 56); Rockville, Maryland
- Education: Brown University; The Hebrew University of Jerusalem
- Scientific career
- Fields: Computer Science, bioinformatics
- Workplaces: University of Delaware; Queen's University; Celera/Applied Biosystems; National Center for Biotechnology Information
- Thesis: Learning Models for Robot Navigation (1998)
- Doctoral advisor: Leslie P. Kaelbling
- Website: www.eecis.udel.edu/~shatkay

Hagit Shatkay (Hebrew: חגית שתקאי; 28 January 1965 - 2 January 2022) was an Israeli-American computer scientist, known for her contributions to computational biology, medical informatics, bioinformatics, and machine learning. She was a professor in the department of computer and information sciences at the University of Delaware. Shatkay was a senior member and served on the board of directors of the International Society for Computational Biology.

== Career ==
Shatkay received her bachelor’s and master’s degrees in computer science from the Hebrew University of Jerusalem. She earned her doctoral degree in computer science from Brown University in 1999, under Leslie Kaelbling. From 1999 to 2000, she served as a postdoctoral fellow at the National Center for Biotechnology Information. From 2001 to 2003, she spent two years as a private-sector informatics research scientist at Celera Genomics. She returned to academia and worked as an assistant professor at Queen's University at Kingston in 2004. She joined the department of computer and information sciences at the University of Delaware as an associate professor in fall 2010. She was promoted to full professor at the University of Delaware in 2018.

Together with Mark Craven (University of Wisconsin), she co-authored the textbook Mining the Biomedical Literature.

Shatkay was a senior member of the International Society for Computational Biology, ISCB. She was also an appointed member of the Computer Science Evaluation Panel of the Natural Sciences and Engineering Research Council of Canada (NSERC).
