= Cygnus X-2 =

Low-mass X-ray binary

Observation data Epoch J2000.0 Equinox ICRS
- Constellation: Cygnus
- Right ascension: 21^{h} 44^{m} 41.15^{s}
- Declination: +38° 19′ 17.1″
- Apparent magnitude (V): 14.8

Characteristics
- Spectral type: A9III
- Variable type: LMXB

Astrometry
Radial velocity (R_{v})	-220.0 km/s
Proper motion (μ)	RA: -1.790 mas/yr Dec.: -0.324 mas/yr
Parallax (π)	0.0684±0.0191 mas
Distance	10400±1000 pc
Absolute magnitude (M_{V})	1.5±0.3

Orbit
Period (P)	9.8444±0.0003 days
Inclination (i)	63±3°
Semi-amplitude (K_{2}) (secondary)	79±3 km/s

Details

Neutron star
Mass	1.5±0.3 M_{☉}
Radius	9.0±0.5 km
Age	150–275 Myr

Main-sequence star
Mass	0.63±0.16 M_{☉}
Radius	7.0±0.5 R_{☉}
Luminosity	130 L_{☉}
Temperature	7000±250 K

Database references
SIMBAD	data

Data sources:

Cygnus X-2, also known as V1341 Cygni, (Note: The designation V1341 Cygni is sometimes used to refer to only the optical star.) is a low-mass X-ray binary (LMXB) containing a neutron star as the compact object. It is located in the constellation Cygnus and is approximately 10,400 parsecs (~34,000 light years) away from Earth. It is located in the galactic halo and may have originally been an intermediate-mass X-ray binary.

== Properties ==
This binary has an orbital period of 9.84 days, which is relatively long for an LMXB. Its orbit is believed to be circular, or nearly so. It does not eclipse with respect to Earth.

The system is 14.2 kiloparsec (kpc) from the center of the galaxy radially, and 2.28 kpc outside of the galactic plane. It is likely that the system was closer to the Galactic Center and the galactic plane in the past, likely 5–10 kpc from the galactic center, but received a kick of approximately 130 km/s from the supernova that produced the neutron star that resulted in its current trajectory and positioning.

=== Neutron star ===
The neutron star in this system is about 1.5M_{☉}. It has a magnetic field of at most 7.6×10^{9} G at the magnetic poles. It is believed to spin at nearly the maximum rate for the neutron star not to lose mass due to centrifugal force.

Its accretion disk makes up a significant proportion of the light emitted from the binary, even in infrared wavelengths. The vertical height of the disk is 10% of its radial extent, making it a geometrically-thin disk. The disk is believed to be moderately ionized.

Cygnus X-2 is a Z source, with a high, near-Eddington accretion rate and an X-ray luminosity circa 10^{38} erg/s. The system experiences type I X-ray bursts and quasi-periodic oscillations. Observations of the system's X-ray spectrum in high detail suggest that the accretion disk has a turbulent and kinematically-active corona, causing significant broadening of the source's Fe–K emission lines due to relativistic reflection.

In 2013, a jet was observed from Cygnus X-2, with a possible receding counter-jet as well. The binary was in the horizontal branch state, which is an expected period of jet emission for Z sources. The jet was travelling at 0.33±0.12c.

=== Donor star ===
The donor main-sequence star is an A-type main-sequence star with a surface temperature of approximately 7000K and a mass of 0.63M_{☉}. It has filled its Roche lobe, resulting in matter from the star being accreted onto the neutron star. The donor star has higher than usual amounts of certain metals, including magnesium, silicon, and sulfur, which may be due to the capture of these elements from the supernova explosion of the other star.

Unlike most LMXBs, the donor star's spectrum is visible and contributes about half of the system's total flux.

The donor star's spectral class is hotter than expected for a star of its mass, and does not vary with orbital phase. It also contains a high concentration of helium, with a primarily helium core. This suggests that the star was originally a 3.5M_{☉} star near the end of its main-sequence phase that lost most of its mass via mass transfer onto the neutron star. This transfer must have been highly nonconservative in order to account for the neutron star's calculated mass—this means that most of the mass lost from the donor star was not accreted by the neutron star but rather lost from the system entirely. If this is true, it would mean that Cygnus X-2 was originally an intermediate-mass X-ray binary, a little-studied class of X-ray binaries with donor star masses slightly greater than the Sun.
