= Plunging region =

Region just outside event horizons

In astrophysics, a plunging region is a region near a black hole in which matter can no longer follow circular orbits and will instead rapidly "plunge" towards the event horizon at nearly the speed of light. This region exists between the innermost stable circular orbit and the event horizon of the black hole. Unlike inside the event horizon, light and radiation can still escape the black hole, but matter is doomed to fall in. The existence of such a region is predicted by Einstein's general theory of relativity.

== Dynamics ==
Upon crossing the innermost stable circular orbit (ISCO), matter can no longer stably orbit the black hole and sharply plunges inwards towards the event horizon. Particles within this plunging region experience rapid acceleration both angularly and towards the horizon. Due to the rapid increase in velocity, for the first half of the matter's inspiral, the density of the accretion disk decreases, but it stabilizes afterwards.

While inside the plunging region, disk material becomes hotter, aided by magnetic reconnection converting magnetic energy into heat, and can contribute to observed x-ray emissions. Self-irradiation by the disk due to extreme gravitational lensing near the horizon may also contribute to the heating. Plunging region dynamics may also be responsible for stronger-than-expected relativistic jets on many black holes, since they induce the magnetic extraction of spin energy, causing plasma to be accelerated away from the disk.

Disk luminosity in the plunging region is dramatically decreased compared to the luminosity of the disk outside the ISCO. Accretion flow inside the ISCO is also smoother and less turbulent than accretion flow far from the black hole. For nonspinning black holes without strong magnetic fields, the accretion disk remains optically thick all the way down to the event horizon. Some sub-Eddington "puffy" accretion disks may even be stable within the ISCO.

== Implications ==
The plunging region affects light given off by a black hole's accretion disk. From this, scientists can deduce the location of the ISCO and the spin of the black hole, since ISCOs closer to the event horizon correspond to faster-spinning black holes. Additionally, magnetosonic waves can escape from inside the plunging region, minorly affecting the luminosity of the disk even outside the ISCO.

Astronomical observations of high-energy nonthermal radiation emitted by x-ray binaries may be explained by electrons escaping from inside the plunging region.
