= Z source =

Type of low-mass X-ray binary

In astrophysics, a Z source is a type of neutron star low-mass X-ray binary (LMXB) distinguishable from the similar atoll source by the characteristic "Z" shape of its X-ray color-color diagram. Z-sources have high rates of accretion, typically more than 50% of the Eddington limit, and relatively strong magnetic fields, although they are not magnetars. Z-sources exhibit three main spectral states known as the horizontal branch, normal branch, and flaring branch.

== Properties ==
Z sources are a type of low-mass X-ray binary containing a weakly-magnetized (non-magnetar) neutron star accreting matter off of a normal star. They have luminosities of approximately 10^{38} erg/s and magnetic fields greater than 10^{9} G. Their spectra are usually dominated by non-thermal, Comptonized emission, but thermal blackbody radiation does play a role, making up as much as 50% of the Z source's total luminosity. Z sources can experience quasi-periodic oscillations in any of their three states. They also experience relativistic reflection.

== Difference from atoll sources ==
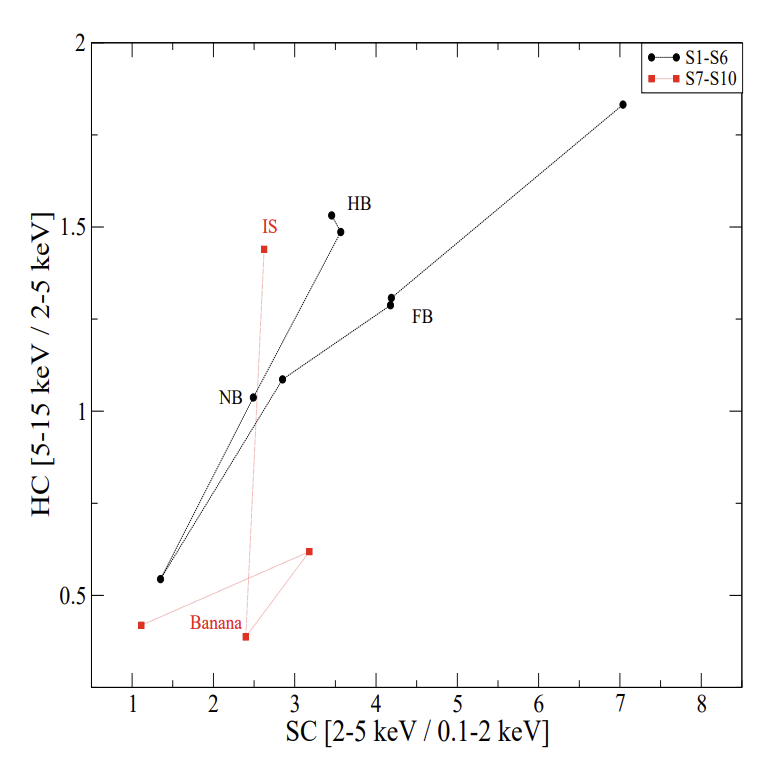
A comparison of typical atoll source (red) and Z source (black) tracks on an X-ray color-color diagram

Atoll sources can be distinguished from Z sources by analyzing their X-ray color-color diagrams. These diagrams compare the ratios of emission of two ranges of high-energy X-ray wavelengths ("hard X-rays") and two ranges of low-energy X-ray wavelengths ("soft X-rays"). When plotted on such a diagram, Z sources have three-branched shapes that look similar to the letter "Z", while atoll sources have long, curved branches and isolated clumps that are reminiscent of an atoll. Atoll sources take longer to move all the way through the diagram, approximately 30–100 days, while Z sources can move through the entire diagram in hours to days.

Atoll sources tend to be less luminous than Z sources, accreting mass less quickly, but luminosity ranges overlap. Atoll sources also have much larger variation in X-ray intensity and energy spectrum than Z sources. X-ray bursting, caused by the unstable nuclear fusion of material accreted onto the neutron star, is generally only seen in atoll sources, with Z sources experiencing longer-lasting X-ray flares instead.

== Horizontal, normal, and flaring states ==
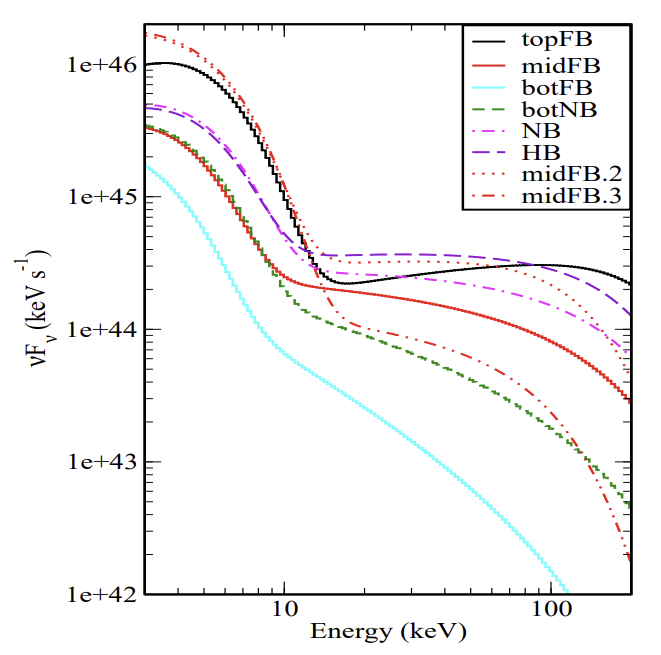
Variations of spectra in Z sources in each of the three states

Z-sources exhibit three main X-ray spectral states, representing the three branches of their "Z" shape on a color-color diagram: the horizontal branch (HB), which forms the top of the Z, the normal branch (NB), which forms the middle of the Z, and the flaring branch (FB), which forms the bottom of the Z. The turning point between the horizontal and normal branches is called the hard apex, while the turning point between the normal and flaring branches is known as the soft apex. Some scientists have suggested that movement across the color-color diagram is due to an increasing accretion rate, while others have argued that it may be caused by variation of the inner radius of the accretion disk.

In the horizontal branch, with the most energetic (hardest) X-ray radiation, light from the Z source is more polarized compared to the normal and flaring branches. It has been suggested that this polarization is due to electron scattering in an accretion disk wind. The normal branch represents an increase in mass accretion rate compared to the flaring branch, resulting in a higher blackbody temperature and increased radiation pressure disrupting the accretion disk and creating relativistic jets. The flaring branch is caused by unstable nuclear fusion of accreted material on the surface of the neutron star, leading to X-ray flares. Some Z sources may have constant flares, giving them higher temperatures and nonstop jets.

== Notable Z sources ==
- Scorpius X-1
- Circinus X-1
- LMC X-2
- Cygnus X-2
