= Relativistic reflection =

Phenomenon in black hole physics

Relativistic reflection is a phenomenon in relativity in which light from the corona of a black hole reflects off of its accretion disk, distorting the disk's emission spectrum. Relativistic effects, such as gravitational redshift and Doppler shift, further distort this spectrum. The specific spectrum emitted is dependent on the properties of the disk, corona, and the black hole itself; analyzing the reflection spectrum of a black hole's disk can therefore provide information about the geometry of the black hole and its surrounding region.

== Mechanism ==
An accreting black hole has a corona, a region of plasma around the black hole, with a temperature on the order of 10^{8}–10^{9}K. The corona emits electromagnetic radiation in the hard x-ray part of the electromagnetic spectrum via inverse Compton scattering of the thermal radiation from the accretion disk. This electromagnetic radiation then hits and irradiates the accretion disk of the black hole. The light then is reflected off of the disk, but the reflected spectrum is affected by the chemical composition and ionization of the disk. Furthermore, as the reflected light leaves the disk, it will be gravitationally redshifted and Doppler shifted due to strong relativistic effects near the black hole.

Relativistic reflection is most prominent at the 6.4 keV iron emission line. The emission line is broadened by reflection off of inner parts of the disk.

== Contributing factors ==
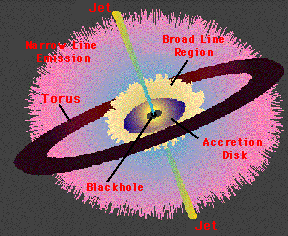
A model of an active galactic nucleus, with the inner disk region of broadened emission lines and the outer disk region of narrow emission lines labelled.

The spectrum emitted depends on the ionization of the disk. If the disk is mostly unionized, it will produce many absorption and emission lines at low energies. If the disk is highly ionized, it acts similarly to a mirror and produces few emission or absorption lines. The shape and flux of the iron emission line depend strongly on the disk ionization.

The spin of the black hole also affects the spectrum. The location of the innermost stable circular orbit (ISCO), and therefore, the inner radius of the accretion disk, is dependent on the spin of the black hole and whether the black hole and the disk are rotating in the same direction or opposite directions. When a black hole is spinning quickly and the disk is rotating in the same direction, the ISCO is very close to the event horizon and more highly redshifted photons are emitted, causing emission lines to be broadened. The emission spectrum also has a blueshifted peak from Doppler-beamed matter on the approaching side of the disk.

Thirdly, the properties of the corona affect the emission spectrum. If the corona is close to the disk, photons are focused onto the inner regions of the disk and the emission lines are broadened. If it is far away from the disk, the entire disk is irradiated more uniformly, creating narrower emission lines. Additionally, if the corona covers a significant proportion of the inner part of the disk, blocking photons from escaping to be detected, the spectral features associated with irradiation of the inner disk will be diminished. Research suggests that the irradiating corona is located primarily above the disk and close to the black hole's axis of rotation, a form called lamppost geometry.

== Measurement ==
Measurement of relativistic reflection is typically done through X-ray reflection spectroscopy. This involves using spectroscopy to measure the emission of radiation in X-ray wavelengths, and then analyzing the profile of observed emission lines. These lines become skewed, with approaching matter moving at relativistic speeds being blueshifted, and matter very close to the black hole being redshifted. When the matter at the inner edge of the accretion disk is closer to the black hole, it becomes more redshifted. Because the accretion disk of a black hole terminates at its ISCO, and the radius of the ISCO is determined by the black hole's spin, the extent of the redshift can be analyzed to measure the spin of the black hole. Thus, the spin of a black hole can be estimated solely from its reflection spectrum, although this technique only works for optically-thick, geometrically-thin disks with accretion rates of 0.01–0.03 times the Eddington limit. Additionally, the corona must be patchy enough that enough of the inner accretion disk is uncovered in order for a sufficient amount of reflected photons to escape and be detected.

High signal-to-noise ratio measurements by telescopes such as XMM-Newton, Suzaku, and NuSTAR have allowed researchers to see more completely the reflection spectrum of accretion disks. Relativistic reflection has been found in the emission spectrum of active galactic nuclei, such as NGC 1365, stellar black holes, such as Cygnus X-1, and even neutron stars. Computer models can also be used to calculate relativistic reflection even without physical observations.

Observations of X-ray reverberation lags by quasars and microquasars can also provide evidence for and insight into relativistic reflection. These lags occur when some photons emitted by the corona escape, generally within the hard X-ray range, while some fall towards the surface of the accretion disk and are reflected off as soft X-rays (reverberation). When observed, therefore, hard X-rays will reach the detector faster than soft X-rays. The extent of this lag and how it changes over different timescales can provide information about the geometry of the corona; for example, if the lag is larger at shorter timescales, the corona is more compact, while if it is larger at longer timescales, the corona is larger and further from the disk.
