= LMC X-2 =

X-ray Binary in the Large Magellanic Cloud

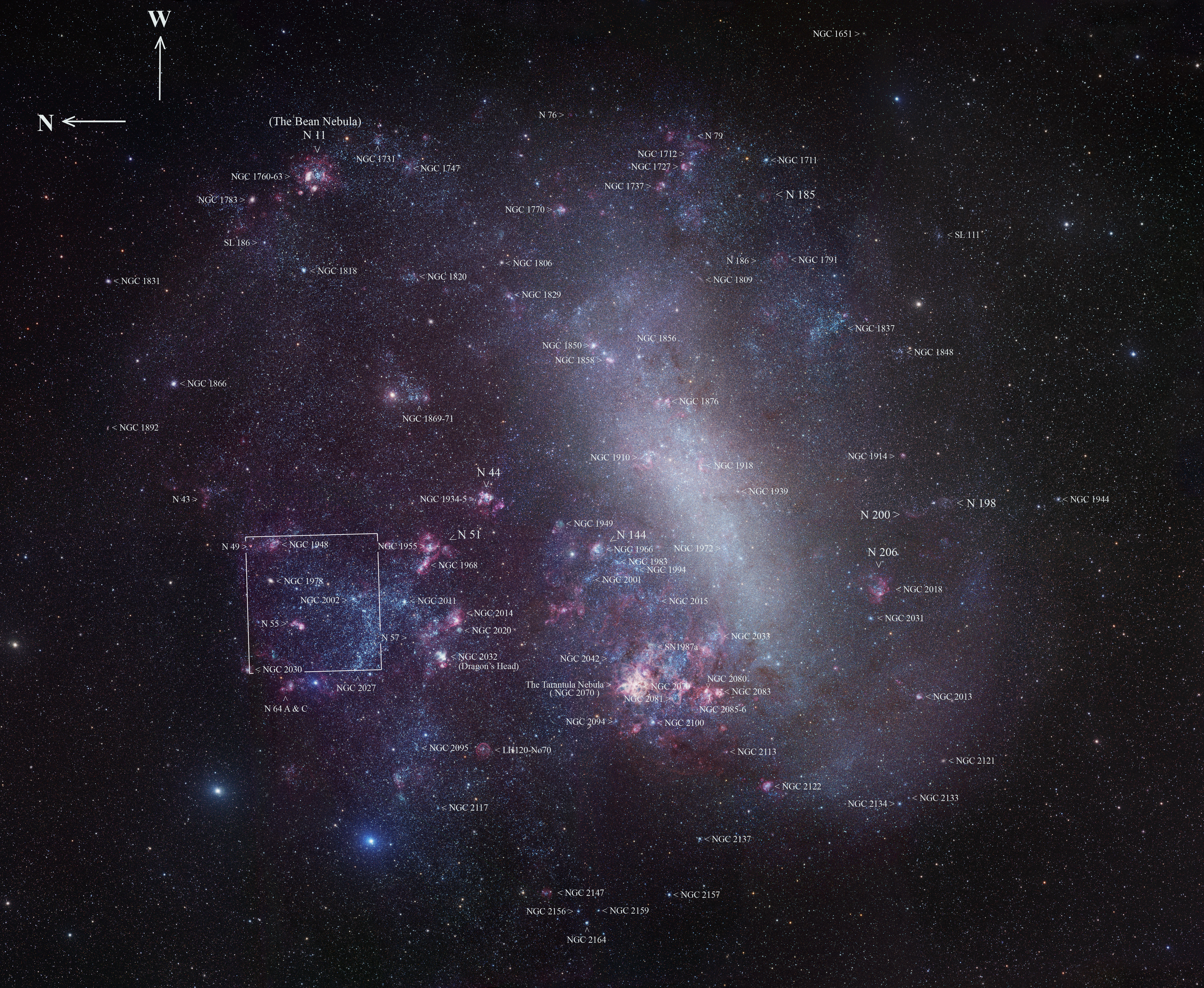

Observation data Epoch J2000 Equinox J2000
- Constellation: Mensa
- Right ascension: 05^{h} 20^{m} 28.2^{s}
- Declination: −71° 57′ 33″
- Apparent magnitude (V): ~18.8

Characteristics
- Evolutionary stage: Neutron star (A); Evolved B-type star (B)
- Spectral type: Neutron star + ?

Astrometry
Radial velocity (R_{v})	262.2 ± 3.4 km/s
Distance	~162,983 ly (~49,970 pc)

Orbit
Primary	neutron star
Secondary	main-sequence star
Period (P)	0.32 ± 0.02 days (8.15 hours)
Inclination (i)	≲70°
Semi-amplitude (K_{2}) (secondary)	315 ± 28 km/s

Details

A
Mass	1.4 ± 0.6 M_{☉}
Radius	≲16 km R_{☉}
Temperature	2,300,000 ± 900,000 K

B
Mass	≤1 M_{☉}
Radius	6-10 km R_{☉}

Other designations
- LMC X-2, SWIFT J0520.9-7156

Database references
SIMBAD	data

LMC X-2 is a low-mass X-ray binary (LMXB) located in the Large Magellanic Cloud (LMC), a satellite galaxy of Milky Way. It is one of the five brightest X-ray sources in the LMC and is the most luminous LMXB with a luminosity ranging from 0.3×10^{37} and 6×10^{38} ergs/s. This binary system consist of a neutron star accreating matter from an orbiting low-mass blue star. Its high luminosity is caused because of its X-ray emission is close to the Eddington limit or Eddington luminosity for a neutron star and because the Large Magellanic Cloud has lower metal abundances, allowing for higher Eddington luminosities and a higher accretion rate causing its high luminosity.

LMC X-2 is classified as a Z-source, a subtype of neutron star LMXB characterized by high accretion rates and a distinctive Z-shaped track in X-ray color-color and hardness-intensity diagrams. These tracks reflect transitions between three spectral states: the horizontal branch, normal branch, and flaring branch. It is the first Z-source identified outside the Milky Way, making it the eighth known Z-source overall.

== Discovery ==
=== Main system ===
The main system of LMC X-2 was discovered around January 1971 by the Uhuru satellite during early satellite flights that identified the system as a point in the LMC along with 2 other points, which are now known as the supersoft X-ray binaries (SSXB) CAL 83 and CAL 87.

== Characteristics ==
=== System Characteristics ===
LMC X-2 consists of a neutron star and a companion evolved B-type star. The companion star orbits the neutron star in 8.15 hours from an inclination of around 70°, its semi-major axis along with the eccentricity is unknown from the lack of orbital information and observations.

=== Physical Characteristics ===
==== Neutron star ====
This neutron star is the main star of the system LMC X-2, this has a diameter around 16 kilometers and a solar mass of 1.4 ± 0.6 by using the X-ray data of LMC X-2 and fit the data in a theoretical blackbody model which relates to the mass and radius along with its temperature.

==== Companion star ====
The companion star of LMC X-2 is quite unknown because of it being outshined by the neutron star it is orbiting, this only has information of the mass and radius of around 1 solar masses and 6 to 10 solar radii.

== Observation ==
LMC X-2 has been extensively studied by multiple X-ray observatories:

- Four observations from Rossi X-ray Timing Explorer (RXTE) revealed the complete Z-diagram, confirming its Z-source classification through spectral state transitions and quasi-periodic oscillations.
- Archival data from XMM-Newton provided high-precision spectral analysis, with models incorporating blackbody emission (neutron star surface, ~1-2 keV) and Comptonization (corona). Luminosities indicate near-Eddington accretion.
- Approximately 140 ks of observations from Astrosat captured broad-band X-ray spectral evolution, showing changes in disk temperature, electron temperature, and optical depth along the Z-track.
- Other Observations from MAXI and Swift Space Telescope indicates persistent emission with occasional flares. No definitive orbital period has been identified despite photometric searches.

== See also ==
- LMC X-1
- LMC X-3
- LMC X-4
- LMC P3
