= Cygnus X =

Cygnus X may refer to:

- Cygnus-X (star complex), a giant star formation region
- Cygnus X (music group)

== See also ==
- Cygnus X-1 (disambiguation)
- Cygnus X-2
- Cygnus X-3
