= Accretion disk corona =

Hot plasma around an accretion disk

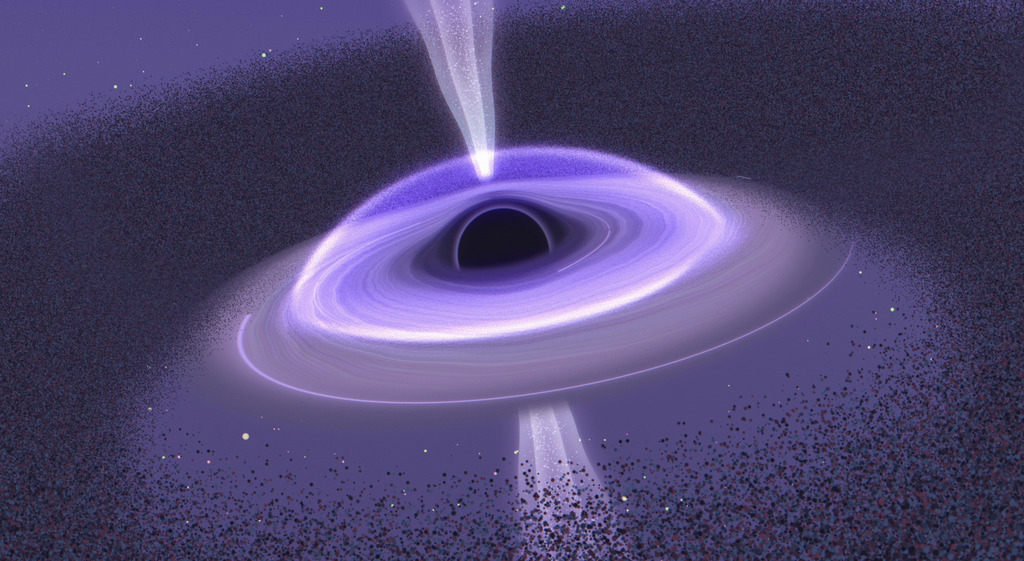
Artist's impression of an active galactic nucleus with the accretion disk corona highlighted

In high-energy astrophysics, an accretion disk corona (ADC) is a region of hot plasma surrounding an accretion disk, analogous to a stellar corona. Accretion disk coronae are particularly relevant to the study of relativistic reflection of black hole and neutron star spectra.

== Formation ==
ADC are thought to be formed by the acceleration and confinement of high-energy particles by the accretion disk's magnetic field. Such a corona could be heated to temperatures much higher than that of the disk by magnetic reconnection, which can occur much more easily in the corona than the comparatively-thick accretion disk. This process is similar to the formation and heating of the Sun's corona.

== Mechanism ==
ADC are regions of hot plasma with a temperature greater than 10^{8} K that emit primarily in hard X-rays. This has a distinct spectral contrast with the accretion disk, which emits primarily in visible light, ultraviolet, or soft X-rays and may have a temperature that is lower by two or more orders of magnitude. This results in the observation of two distinct spectral components and a correlation between ultraviolet and X-ray luminosities. ADC can be either optically-thin or optically-thick, with optical depth increasing for higher accretion rates.

When an accretion disk radiates, that radiation is inverse-Compton-scattered by hot electrons in the corona, producing X-ray and gamma-ray power-law radiation. About half of that radiation hits the accretion disk and is eventually re-emitted as blackbody radiation, producing a reflection spectrum that can be observed.

== Geometry ==
ADC are thought to be located over top of the inner accretion disk near the innermost stable circular orbit (ISCO), perpendicular to the object's spin axis. This model is known as lamppost geometry after its shape. ADC are also believed to be patchy in order for light emitted from the inner disk to be observed.

The model of lamppost geometry often leads to ADC being approximated as point sources over the object's spin axis in mathematical models. It is possible, however, that ADC could be conical, cylindrical, or spheroidal. The geometry of ADC is difficult to confirm experimentally due to only small differences in emitted spectra requiring precise observations to differentiate. The largest difference in spectra between these models is at the Fe-kα emission line.

For slowly-rotating black holes, a lamppost ADC must be far above the object (>5 gravitational radii) in order to explain observed X-ray emission. However, for quickly-spinning black holes, the lamppost ADC can be much closer and still fit with observations. It is also possible that the corona may still exhibit lamppost geometry, but be misaligned with the spin axis.

X-ray observations of the timing of emission from ADC sources suggest that ADC are likely relatively low above the accretion disk, but may extend vertically upward to about 10 gravitational radii above the disk. Observations and mathematical simulations also suggest that material in ADC moves at mildly relativistic speeds compared to disk material.

== Effects ==
=== Effects on disks ===
When a large proportion of energy released from accretion of matter is dissipated by an ADC, the disk becomes colder, denser, geometrically thinner, and optically thicker. Additionally, reflection spectra from coronal emission off of accretion disks can allow researchers to determine the inclination, ionization, and iron abundance of the disk.

=== Partial X-ray eclipses ===
Sometimes, X-ray sources with coronae dim in the X-ray spectrum due to diffusion of light from the accretion disk by the corona. These eclipses can help astronomers verify that a source has a corona. (Note: This phenomenon cannot be attributed to an eclipse by another star (e.g. the source's binary partner) because in that case, dimming would occur throughout the electromagnetic spectrum.)

=== Relativistic reflection ===
When light from the corona hits the inner accretion disk, that light both reflects off of the disk and heats the disk enough to emit X-ray radiation itself. However, due to its proximity to a compact object, the light emitted off of the inner disk is gravitationally redshifted. This leads to a characteristic altered spectrum, particularly prominent around the Fe-kα line, which is associated with highly-ionized iron. This reflection spectrum may also have blueshifted components due to the Doppler shift of matter in the disk travelling at relativistic speeds.

=== Quasi-periodic oscillations ===
A certain type of quasi-periodic oscillations (QPOs), called type-C QPOs, may be explained by dynamics between the accretion disk and the corona. Under this model, photons reflected off of the accretion disk interact with hot electrons in the corona. When the density of reflected photons increases, the electron energy density decreases. Due to the decrease in electron energy density, the density of reflected photons decreases, similar to a predator-prey relationship. Although these oscillations eventually taper off, they can be re-ignited by perturbations to the system. This model is consistent with observations of ~1M_{☉} neutron stars such as 4U 1728–34 and Scorpius X-1.

== Known sources with accretion disk coronae ==
- Cygnus X-1
- Cygnus X-2
- Hercules X-1
- 4U 1822–37
- 4U 2129+47
- GX 339–4
- 2S 0921–63
- 4U 1624–49
