= Reflection spectrum =

Spectrum of light after reflection off of an object

In physics, a reflection spectrum is the spectrum of reflected light emitted from an object or material. The properties of the reflecting material affect its reflection spectrum, allowing for chemical analysis of the substance. Reflection spectra can also provide information about the original light source. Reflection spectroscopy has applications in astronomy and materials science.

== Astronomy ==
=== Exoplanetology ===
The atmospheres of exoplanets reflect light from their host stars, and these reflection spectra can be used to determine the atmospheric composition of a planet. Different elements and compounds reflect light differently, and astronomers can use spectroscopy to determine the peak frequencies at which light is reflected and therefore what compounds are doing the reflecting. It may also be possible to use reflection spectra to observe the surface composition of terrestrial planets; this would also confirm experimentally that the planet is terrestrial. Reflection spectra can also reveal molecules in a planet's atmosphere that are commonly associated with or created by life, providing evidence that an exoplanet may host life.

=== High-energy astrophysics ===
Accretion disks of black holes and neutron stars frequently show a spectrum associated with the reflection of light from an irradiating source; this source is generally believed to be a corona surrounding the disk. Accretion disk reflection spectra are generally most prominent in X-ray wavelengths. The spectrum of coronal emission is altered based on properties of the disk and relativistic effects such as gravitational redshift; this phenomenon is known as relativistic reflection. Thus, accretion disk reflection spectra can provide direct information on the structure, temperature, composition, and degree of ionization of the disk, as well as the spin rate of the compact object.

== Materials science ==
Reflection spectra can aid in identifying and distinguishing similar materials or compounds, such as different types of oil. When light reflects off of a substance, that substance's chemical properties directly affect the spectrum of light reflected off of that substance. This can be used to identify compounds that may be difficult to distinguish otherwise, particularly in machine-learning algorithms that identify different compounds by spectrum. Reflection spectra can also be used to identify properties of compounds, such as refraction index, polarity, and viscosity. Factors that can affect a material's reflection spectrum include temperature, particle size, and presence (or absence) of a magnetic field.
