= Shakura =

Shakura (Russian: Шаку́ра) may refer to:

- Nikolai Shakura (born 1945), Belarusian astronomer
- Shakura S'Aida, Canadian jazz and blues singer

== See also ==
- 14322 Shakura, an asteroid
- Shakhura, a village in Bahrain
- Shakurov (Russian: Шакуров)
- Shakur (Russian: Шакур)
