= Geometrical thickness =

Property of accretion disks

In accretion disk physics, geometrical thickness is a property of an accretion disk representing the relative vertical scale height (thickness) of the disk. Disks can be categorized as geometrically thin, slim, or thick. Thicker disks have higher mass accretion rates than thinner ones, as radiation pressure increases with the mass accretion rate, expanding the disk vertically.

== Categorization ==
Thin, slim, and thick disks can be approximately differentiated by the ratio of the half-thickness of the disk to the radial distance of the disk from the accreting object, $h/r$ (sometimes called the aspect ratio). Thin disks have $h/r\ll 1$, slim disks have $h/r\lesssim 1$, and thick disks $h/r>1$.

Another type of accretion disk, advection-dominated accretion flows, have aspect ratios similar to a slim disk, but have properties different than conventional thin, slim, or thick disks.

== Thin disks ==
Geometrically thin disks have low, sub-Eddington accretion rates and low luminosities. They have small scale heights and are confined largely to the equatorial plane, terminating cleanly at the innermost stable circular orbit (ISCO) if the accreting object is a black hole, although the inner radius may be affected by magnetic torque. Additionally, they tend to be optically thick and bright due to electron scattering and absorption.

Thin disks have negligible self-gravity and high accretion efficiencies. They also have high radiative efficiencies, leaving them with relatively cool temperatures. Matter in thin disks has large angular momentum and typically moves in circular, Keplerian orbits. Thin disks may be less stable when general relativity is incorporated.

Because thin disks are easier than other types to approximate mathematically, since vertical energy transfer is negligible or easily simplified, they are often preferred in mathematical models. A commonly-used model is an optically thick, geometrically thin disk.

=== Advection-dominated accretion flows ===
Similar to thin disks, advection-dominated accretion flows (ADAF) have low mass accretion rates. However, unlike thin disks, they have a high, nearly-virial gas temperature and significant advection takes place, and their scale heights are more similar to slim disks. They are supported by thermal pressure and are optically thin. ADAF can exist with similar mass-accretion rates to thin disks, just under different physical conditions. Sagittarius A*, the supermassive black hole in the center of the Milky Way, can be described by the ADAF model.

== Slim disks ==
Slim disks have accretion rates around the Eddington limit, and are supported mainly by radiation pressure. They are moderately thick and have moderate opacity, with increased advective energy transport and reduced radiative efficiency. A slim disk can extend inside of the ISCO. Slim disks have moderate accretion efficiencies.

Vertical energy transfer processes are important in slim disks. The thickness of a slim disk is determined by the balance between the outward radiation pressure and the inward vertical gravitational force. Thicker slim disks emit relativistic outflows due to radiation pressure.

== Thick disks ==
Thick disks have super-Eddington accretion rates and high luminosities. These disks are toroidal in shape and are sometimes called Polish doughnuts. They have large vertical scale heights and are not confined to the equatorial plane, and can extend inside of the ISCO. Thick disks are almost entirely supported by radiation pressure rather than gas pressure and have lower accretion efficiencies than thin and slim disks. They are generally optically thick.

For thick disks, the effects of advection and the disk's magnetic field are important. It is believed that relativistic jets are generated by rotating black holes with geometrically thick disks because they have strong vertical magnetic fields. The turbulent and radial motions of gas in a thick disk are also believed to affect the disk's reflection spectrum, although how and to what extent is still under scientific debate.

== Application to other systems ==
Although geometrical thickness is often studied in regards to the accretion disks of black holes and neutron stars, it can also be applied to other astrophysical systems, including protoplanetary disks, circumstellar disks, circumplanetary disks, and planetary rings. These objects are generally considered to be geometrically thin.
