= Cygnus X-1 (disambiguation) =

Cygnus X-1 is an X-ray source in the constellation Cygnus.

Cygnus X-1 may also refer to:

- "Cygnus X-1" (song series), a two-part song by the band Rush
- "Cygnus X-1", a song by Bethany Curve from the album Gold

== See also ==
- Cygnus X (disambiguation)
