= Rashid Sunyaev =

Russian astronomer (born 1943)

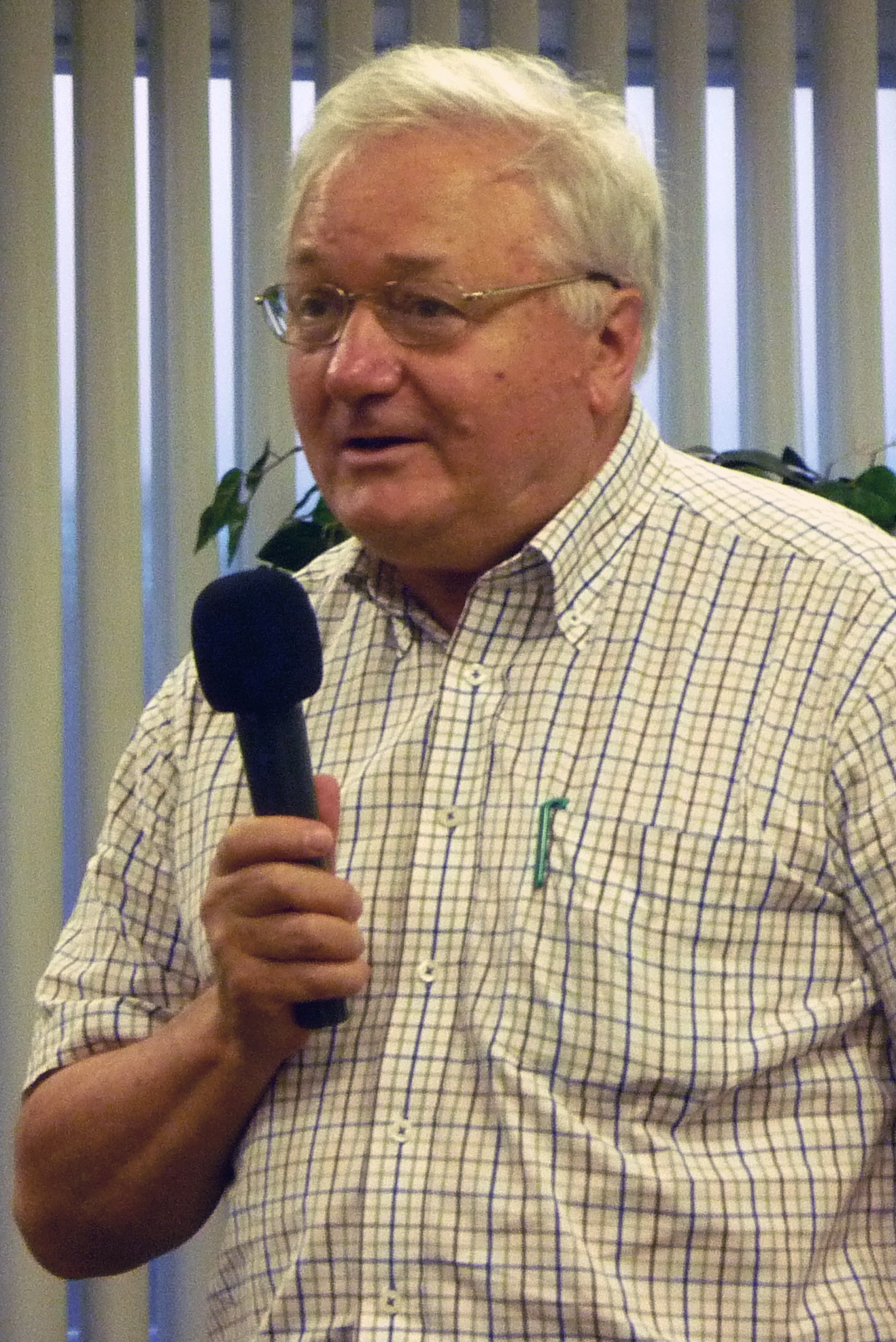
- Sunyaev in 2010
- Born: 1 March 1943 (age 83); Tashkent, Uzbek SSR, Soviet Union
- Education: Moscow Institute of Physics and Technology (MS), Moscow State University (Ph.D)
- Known for: Cosmic microwave background radiation
- Awards: King Faisal International Prize for Physics (2009), Gruber Cosmology Prize (2003); Heineman Prize (2003), Crafoord Prize (2008), Kyoto Prize (2011), Dirac Medal, ICTP (2019), Max Planck Medal (2023)
- Scientific career
- Fields: Astronomer
- Workplaces: Russian Academy of Sciences, Max Planck Institute for Astrophysics, Institute for Advanced Study

Rashid Alievich Sunyaev (Tatar: Рәшит Гали улы Сөнәев, Russian: Раши́д Али́евич Сюня́ев; born 1 March 1943) is a Russian astrophysicist of Tatar descent. He got his MS degree from the Moscow Institute of Physics and Technology (MIPT) in 1966. He became a professor at MIPT in 1974. Sunyaev was the head of the High Energy Astrophysics Department of the Russian Academy of Sciences, and has been chief scientist of the Academy's Space Research Institute since 1992. He has also been a director of the Max Planck Institute for Astrophysics in Garching, Germany, since 1996, and Maureen and John Hendricks Distinguished Visiting Professor in the School of Natural Sciences at the Institute for Advanced Study in Princeton since 2010.

== Works ==
Sunyaev and Yakov Zeldovich developed the theory for the evolution of density fluctuations in the early universe. They predicted the pattern of acoustic fluctuations that have been clearly seen by WMAP and other CMB experiments in the microwave sky and in the large-scale distribution of galaxies. Sunyaev and Zeldovich stated in their 1970 paper, "A detailed investigation of the spectrum of fluctuations may, in principle, lead to an understanding of the nature of initial density perturbations since a distinct periodic dependence of the spectral density of perturbations on wavelength (mass) is peculiar to adiabatic perturbations." CMB experiments have now seen this distinctive scale in temperature and polarization measurements. Large-scale structure observations have seen this scale in galaxy clustering measurements.

With Zeldovich, at the Moscow Institute of Applied Mathematics, he proposed what is known as the Sunyaev-Zeldovich effect, which is due to electrons associated with gas in galaxy clusters scattering the cosmic microwave background radiation.

Sunyaev and Nikolay I. Shakura developed a model of accretion onto black holes, from a disk, and he has proposed a signature for X-radiation from matter spiraling into a black hole. He has collaborated in important studies of the early universe, including the recombination of hydrogen and the formation of the cosmic microwave background radiation. He led the team which operated the X-ray observatory attached to the Kvant-1 module of the Mir space station and also the GRANAT orbiting X-ray observatory. Kvant made the first detection of X-rays from a supernova in 1987. His team is currently preparing the Spectrum-X-Gamma International Astrophysical Project and is working with INTEGRAL spacecraft data. At Garching he is working in the fields of theoretical high energy astrophysics and physical cosmology and participates in the data interpretation of the ESA Planck spacecraft mission.

== Honors and awards ==
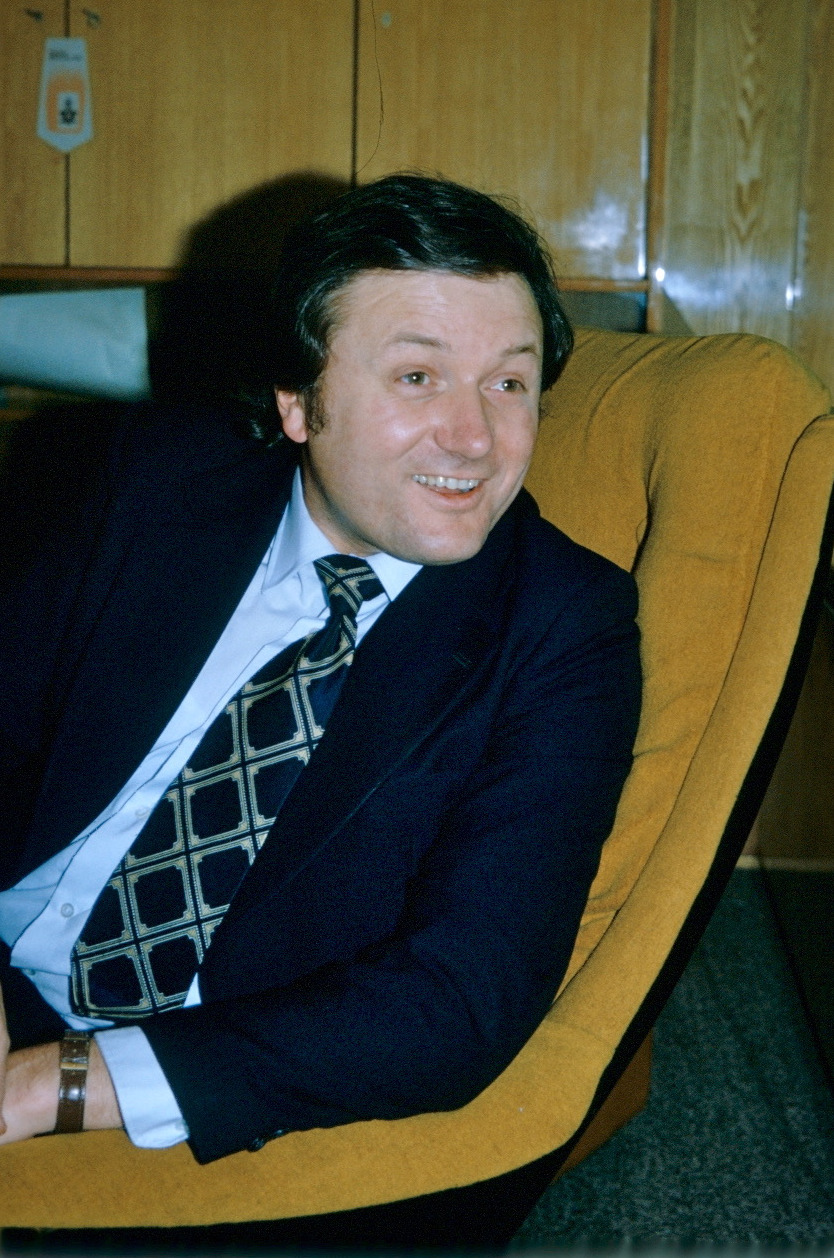
Sunyaev in 1980

- 1984 – Member of the Russian Academy of Sciences
- 1988 – Bruno Rossi Prize for his contributions to understanding cosmic X-ray sources, especially the structure of accretion disks around black holes, the X-ray spectra of compact objects, and the Mir-based discovery of hard X-ray emission from supernova 1987A
- 1991 – Foreign Associate of USA National Academy of Sciences
- 1995 – Gold Medal of the Royal Astronomical Society
- 2000 – Bruce Medal for a lifetime of outstanding research in astronomy
- 2000 – State Prize of Russian Federation for research of Black Holes and Neutron stars with GRANAT X-ray and gamma-ray astrophysical observatory in 1990–1998
- 2002 – Alexander Friedman Prize by Russian Academy of Sciences for the publications on the reduction of brightness of cosmic microwave background radiation in the direction of clusters of galaxies
- 2003 – Heineman Prize for outstanding work in astrophysics
- 2003 – Gruber Prize in Cosmology for pioneering studies on the nature of the cosmic microwave background and its interaction with intervening matter that led to new cosmological models
- 2003 – Member of German Academy of Natural Scientists Leopoldina
- 2004 – Foreign Member of the Royal Netherlands Academy of Arts and Sciences
- 2007 – International Member of the American Philosophical Society
- 2008 – Crafoord Prize for decisive contributions to high-energy astrophysics and cosmology.
- 2008 – Henry Norris Russell Lectureship in 2008
- 2008 – Karl Schwarzschild Medal of the German Astronomische Gesellschaft
- 2009 – Foreign Member of the Royal Society
- 2009 – King Faisal International Prize for Science (Physics)
- 2011 – Kyoto Prize
- 2012 – Benjamin Franklin Medal in Physics from the Franklin Institute
- 2013 – Order of Merit of Republic of Tatarstan, Russia
- 2013 – Gold Medal of the Tatarstan Academy of Sciences (Kazan, Russia)
- 2014 – Einstein Professorship (Chinese Academy of Sciences)
- 2019 – Dirac Medal, (ICTP) jointly with Viatcheslav Mukhanov and Alexei Starobinsky
- 2019 – Nick Kylafis Lectureship
- 2023 – Max Planck Medal of the DPG

== Literature ==
- Bhattacharjee, Y. (31 December 2009). "In the Afterglow Of the Big Bang". Science. 327 (5961). American Association for the Advancement of Science (AAAS): 26–29. doi:10.1126/science.327.5961.26. ISSN 0036-8075. PMID 20044554.

== See also ==
- Ubaydulla Uvatov
