= NGC 3783 =

Galaxy in the constellation Centaurus

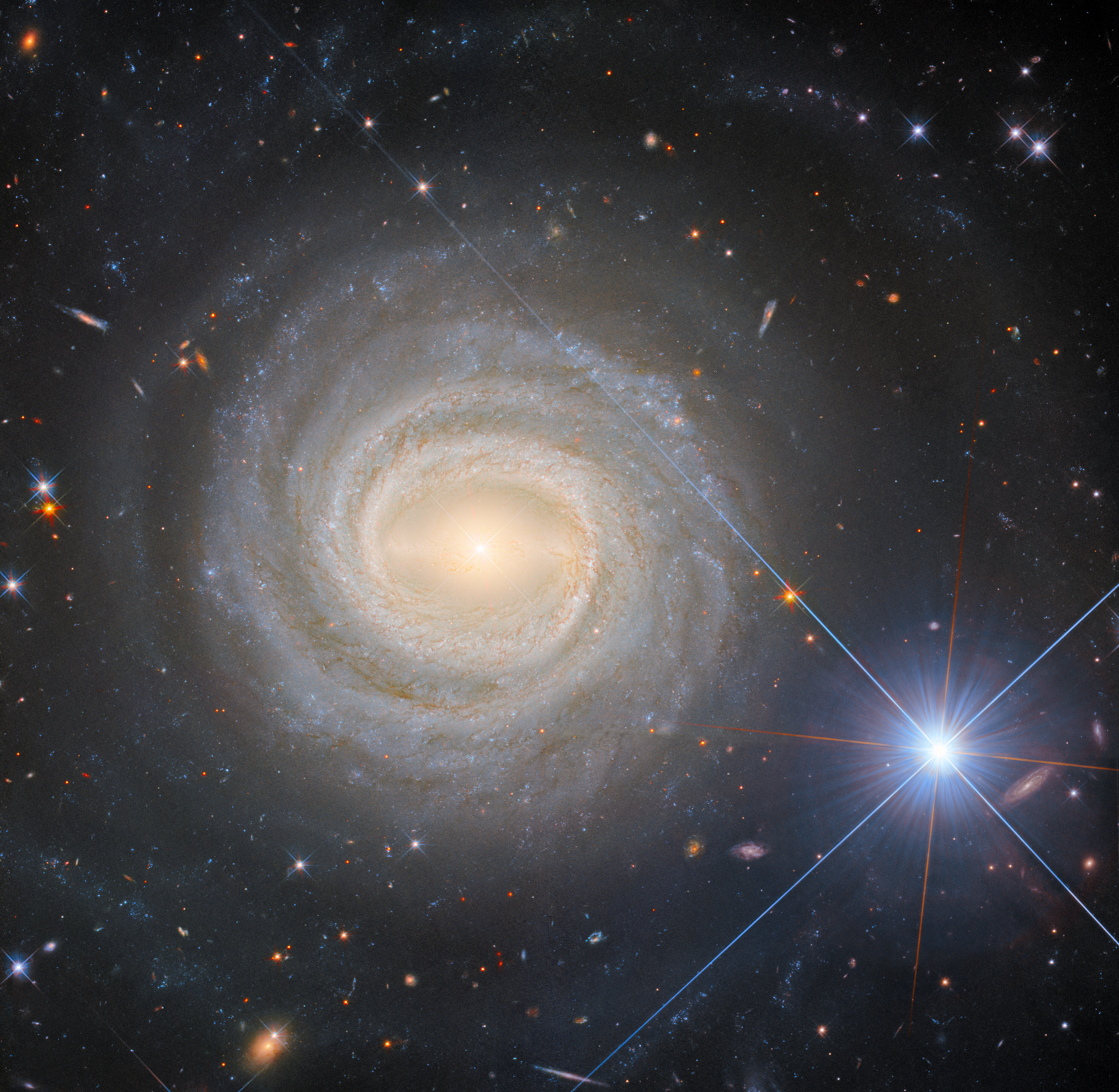
- NGC 3783 imaged by the Hubble Space Telescope

Observation data (J2000 epoch)
- Constellation: Centaurus
- Right ascension: 11^{h} 39^{m} 01.721^{s}
- Declination: –37° 44′ 18.60″
- Redshift: 0.008506 ± 0.000100
- Heliocentric radial velocity: +2,817 km/s
- Distance: 135.7 Mly (41.60 Mpc)
- Group or cluster: NGC 3783 group
- Apparent magnitude (V): 13.43

Characteristics
- Type: SBa
- Size: ~212,800 ly (65.25 kpc) (estimated)
- Apparent size (V): 1′.9 × 1′.7
- Notable features: Seyfert 1

Other designations
- ESO 378- G 014, IRAS 11365-3727, MCG -06-26-004, PGC 36101

NGC 3783 is a barred spiral galaxy located about 135 million light years away in the constellation Centaurus. Its velocity with respect to the cosmic microwave background is 3234 ± 22 km/s, which corresponds to a Hubble distance of 155.6 ± 10.9 Mly (47.70 ± 3.35 Mpc). In addition, two non-redshift measurements give a distance of 155.74 ± 30.17 Mly (47.750 ± 9.250 Mpc). It was discovered by British astronomer John Herschel on 21 April 1835.

NGC 3783 is inclined by an angle of 23° to the line of sight from the Earth along a position angle of about 163°. The morphological classification of SBa indicates a bar structure across the center (B) and tightly wound spiral arms (a). Although not shown by this classification, observers note the galaxy has a luminous inner ring surrounding the bar structure. The bright compact nucleus is active and categorized as a Seyfert 1 type. This nucleus is a strong source of X-ray emission and undergoes variations in emission across the electromagnetic spectrum.

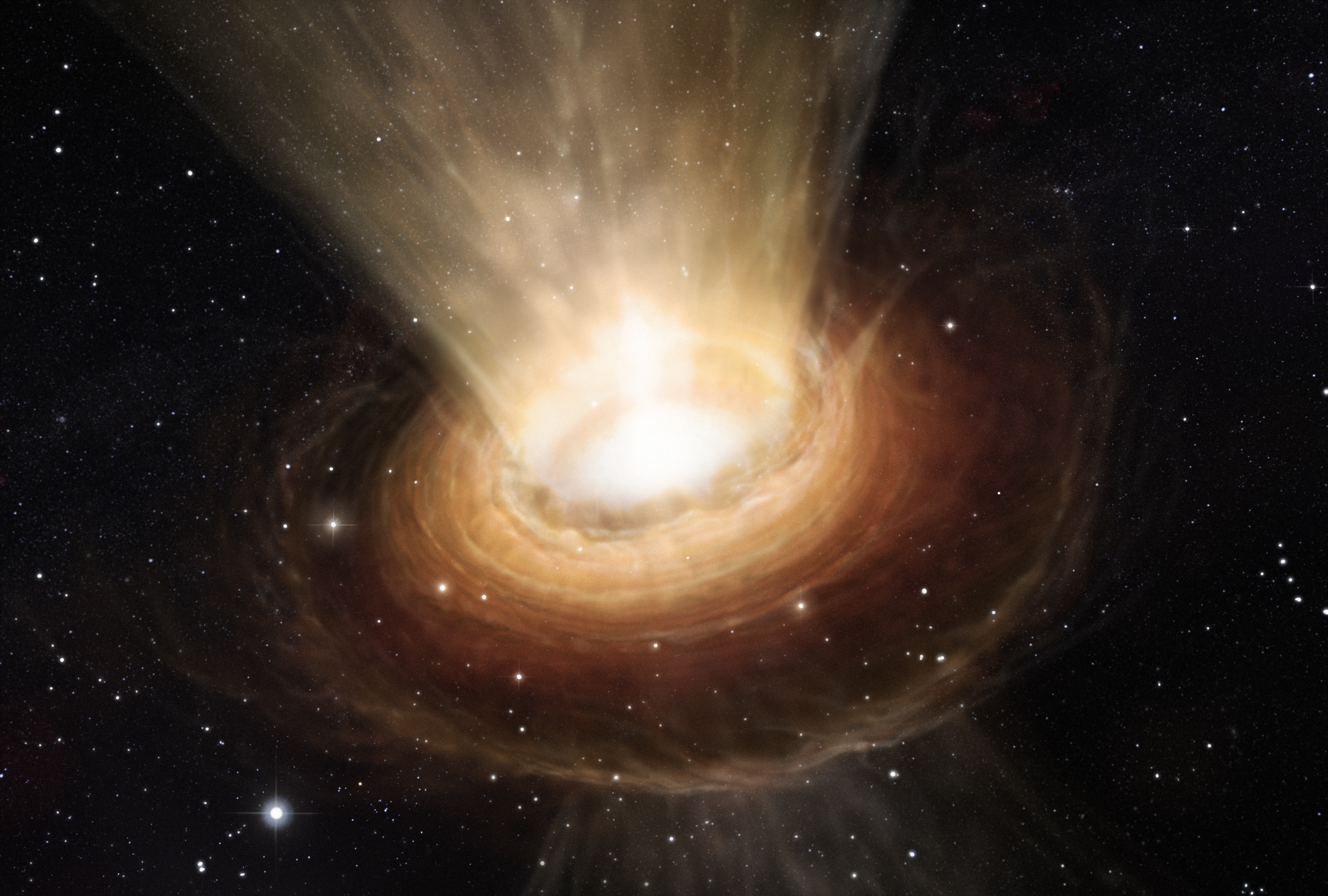
Artist's impression of the surroundings of the supermassive black hole in NGC 3783 (ESO)

The source of the activity in this galaxy is a rapidly rotating supermassive black hole, which is located at the core and is surrounded by an accretion disk of dust. The estimated mass of this black hole, from reverberation mapping, is about 2.8 million times the mass of the Sun. Interferometric observations yield an inner radius of 0.52 ± 0.16 ly (0.16 ± 0.05 pc) for the orbiting torus of dust.

This is a member of a loose association of 47 galaxies known as the NGC 3783 group. Located at a mean distance of 117 million light-years (36 Mpc), the group is centered at coordinates α = 11^{h} 37^{m} 12^{s}, δ = –37° 30′ 57.6″: equivalent to about 870×10^{3} ly (267 kpc) from NGC 3783. The NGC 3783 group has a mean velocity of 2,903 ± 26 km/s with respect to the Sun and a velocity dispersion of 190 ± 24 km/s. The diffuse X-ray emission of the group is roughly centered on the galaxy NGC 3783. The NGC 3783 group is located in the Hydra-Antlia region of the Hydra-Centaurus Supercluster.

== Gallery ==
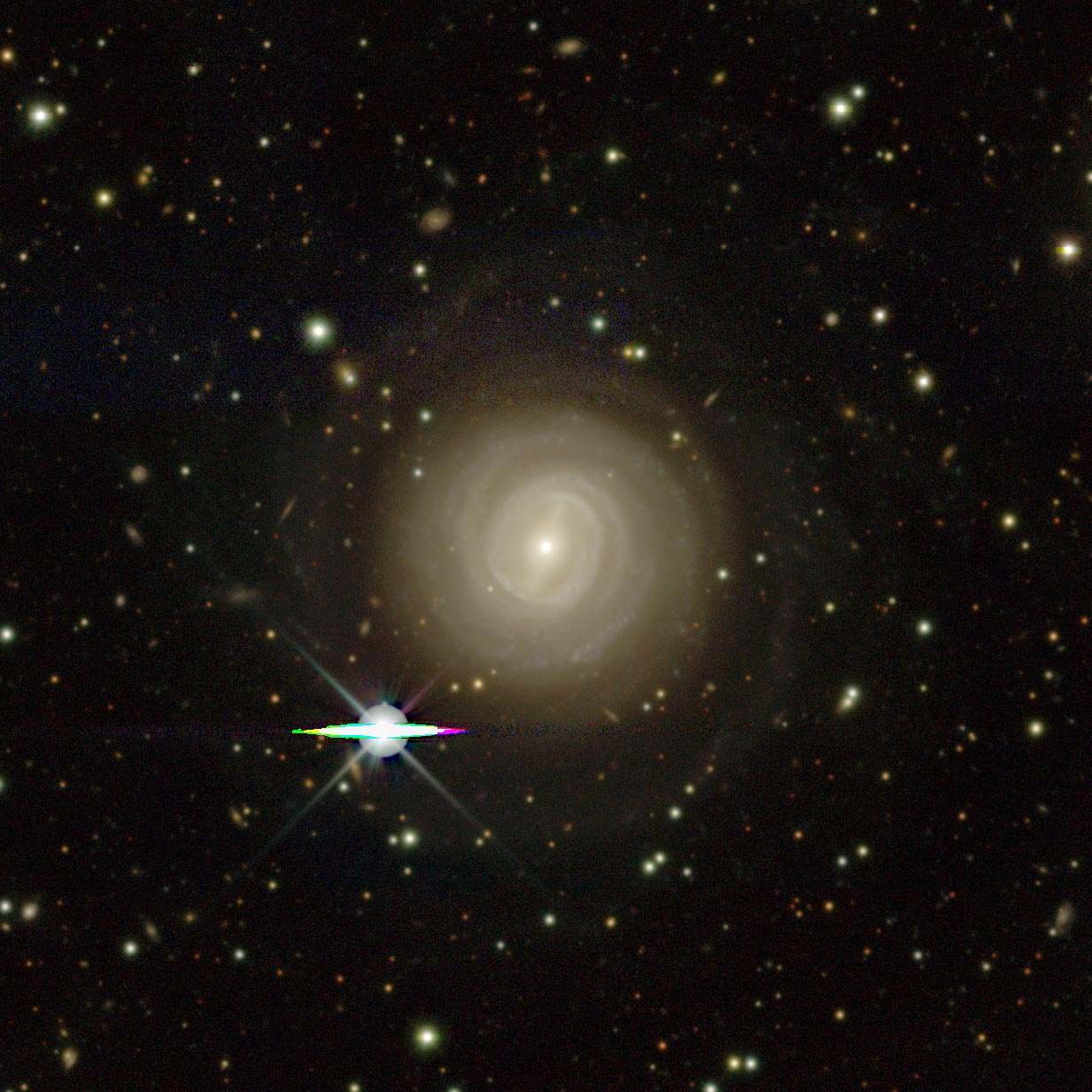
NGC 3783 as seen by the legacy surveys. The bright star on the lower left is HD 101274

This video shows an artist's impression of the dusty wind emanating from the black hole at the centre of galaxy NGC 3783
