= Tendex line =

Line describing path of matter near a black hole

A tendex line (from the Latin "tendere": To stretch) is a traversal line describing the path matter takes through the accretion disc of a black hole. A tendex line typically follows a spiral around the black hole descending to the event horizon. Matter on this line experiences a stretching effect, while vortex lines describe a twisting effect.

Both of these types of lines can be used to visualise black holes, and the ways in which spacetime warps around them. They may also help to explain phenomena such as the 'kicks' observed in simulations of merging black holes as they are flung away from their host galaxies, and may also help in the search for gravitational waves.

== See also ==
- Frame-Dragging Vortexes and Tidal Tendexes Attached to Colliding Black Holes: Visualizing the Curvature of Spacetime
