= Nikolai Shakura =

Russian astrophysicist

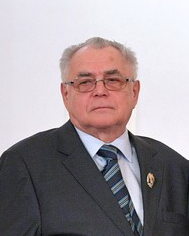
Nikolai Ivanovich Shakura

Nikolai Ivanovich Shakura (Николай Иванович Шакура; born October 7, 1945, in Belarus SSR) is a Russian astrophysicist. He is the head of the relativistic astrophysics department at the Sternberg Astronomical Institute, Moscow University. As a well-known specialist in the theory of accretion disks, as well as X-ray binaries, together with Rashid Sunyaev, he is particularly famous as the developer of the standard theory of disk accretion.
