= Spectral broadening =

Emission spectrum with Lorentzian profile

Spectral broadening refers to the widening of emitted wavelengths of radiation due to a number of different physical processes. This phenomenon is important to a variety of contexts, including lasers, optics, magnetic resonance, and semiconductors.

== Homogeneous Broadening ==
Homogeneous broadening is a phenomenon whereby a spectral line is broadened by effects experienced equally by all atoms (or optical systems more generally).

Nominally, the radiation emitted/absorbed by such systems will be monochromatic. Homogeneous broadening cause these lines to take on a lorentzian profile with an associated spectral linewidth. The following sections address broadening within atomic lines.

=== Natural Broadening ===
Broadening of a spectral line due to the natural linewidth of an atomic transition is called natural broadening. The natural linewidth of an atomic transition arises from interactions between an atom and the vacuum radiation field, leading to spontaneous emission.

== Inhomogeneous Broadening ==
Inhomogeneous broadening as sum of normally distributed Lorentzians

In many solids the local environment of each individual system may differ. For example in Rare Earth doped crystals each ion may experience slightly different electric fields and the frequencies of their transitions may shift via the Stark effect. Such shifts typically occur in a continuous manner according to some probability distribution, meaning these individual shifts constitute as a broadening of the combined feature.

In the event of the broadening of a Lorentzian profile by such a Gaussian spreading one will observe a Voigt profile. The limit of a narrow Lorentzian that is significantly broadened is a Gaussian.

If inhomogeneous broadening dominates homogeneous, Spectral hole burning may be used to extract a local systems spectral feature (i.e. a class of systems that have no or minimal inhomogeneous broadening). This approach is typically used in Rare Earth doped materials which exhibit narrow homogenous linewidths (for example the ^{5}D_{0}-^{7}F_{0} line of trivalent europium doped in Y_{2}SiO_{5} has a 122 Hz homogenous linewidth and 0.63 GHz when cooled to 2K).

=== Doppler Broadening ===
In many gaseous systems, such as vapor cell references, Doppler broadening is dominant. Doppler broadening is inhomogeneous as different atoms in a thermal Maxwell–Boltzmann distribution will have different velocities and thus "see" the incoming light as Doppler shifted. This broadening may be overcome by such techniques as saturated absorption spectroscopy.

== Broadening in laser systems ==
Broadening in laser physics is a physical phenomenon that affects the spectroscopic line shape of the laser emission profile. The laser emission is due to the (excitation and subsequent) relaxation of a quantum system (atom, molecule, ion, etc.) between an excited state (higher in energy) and a lower one. These states can be thought of as the eigenstates of the energy operator. The difference in energy between these states is proportional to the frequency/wavelength of the photon emitted. Since this energy difference has a fluctuation, then the frequency/wavelength of the "macroscopic emission" (the beam) will have a certain width (i.e. it will be "broadened" with respect to the "ideal" perfectly monochromatic emission).

Depending on the nature of the fluctuation, there can be two types of broadening. If the fluctuation in the frequency/wavelength is due to a phenomenon that is the same for each quantum emitter, there is homogeneous broadening, while if each quantum emitter has a different type of fluctuation, the broadening is inhomogeneous.

Examples of situations where the fluctuation is the same for each system (homogeneous broadening) are natural or lifetime broadening, and collisional or pressure broadening. In these cases each system is affected "on average" in the same way (e.g. by the collisions due to the pressure).

The most frequent situation in solid state systems where the fluctuation is different for each system (inhomogeneous broadening) is when because of the presence of dopants, the local electric field is different for each emitter, and so the Stark effect changes the energy levels in an inhomogeneous way. The homogeneous broadened emission line will have a Lorentzian profile (i.e. will be best fitted by a Lorentzian function), while the inhomogeneously broadened emission will have a Gaussian profile. One or more phenomena may be present at the same time, but if one has a wider fluctuation, it will be the one responsible for the character of the broadening.

These effects are not limited to laser systems, or even to optical spectroscopy. They are relevant in magnetic resonance as well, where the frequency range is in the radiofrequency region for NMR, and one can also refer to these effects in EPR where the lineshape is observed at fixed (microwave) frequency and in a magnetic field range.

== Semiconductors ==
In semiconductors, if all oscillations have the same eigenfrequency $\omega_0$ and the broadening in the imaginary part of the dielectric function $\varepsilon_2(\omega)$ results only from a finite damping $\gamma$, the system is said to be homogeneously broadened, and $\varepsilon_2(\omega)$ has a Lorentzian profile. If the system contains many oscillators with slightly different frequencies about $\omega_0$ however, then the system is inhomogeneously broadened.

== See also ==
- Homogeneity (physics)
