= Innermost stable circular orbit =

Smallest stable circular orbit of a particle

The innermost stable circular orbit (often called the ISCO) is the smallest marginally stable circular orbit in which a test particle can stably orbit a massive object in general relativity. The location of the ISCO, the ISCO-radius ($r_{\mathrm{isco}}$), depends on the mass and angular momentum (spin) of the central object. The ISCO plays an important role in black hole accretion disks since it marks the inner edge of the disk.

The ISCO should not be confused with the Roche limit, the innermost point where a physical object can orbit before tidal forces break it up. The ISCO is concerned with theoretical test particles, not real objects. In general terms, the ISCO will be far closer to the central object than the Roche limit.

== Basic concept ==
In classical mechanics, an orbit is achieved when a test particle's angular momentum is enough to resist the gravity force of the central object. As the test particle approaches the central object, the required amount of angular momentum grows, due to the inverse square law nature of gravitation. This can be seen in practical terms in artificial satellite orbits; in geostationary orbit at 35,786 kilometres (22,236 mi) the orbital speed is 10,800 kilometres per hour (6,700 mph), whereas in low Earth orbit it is 27,000 kilometres per hour (17,000 mph). Orbits can be achieved at any altitude, as there is no upper limit to velocity in classical mechanics.

General relativity (GR) introduces an upper limit to the speed of any object: the speed of light. If a test particle is lowered in orbit toward a central object in GR, the test particle will eventually require a speed greater than light to maintain an orbit. This defines the innermost possible instantaneous orbit, known as the innermost circular orbit, which lies at 1.5 times the Schwarzschild radius (for a black hole governed by the Schwarzschild metric). This distance is also known as the photon sphere.

In GR, gravity is not treated as a central force that pulls on objects; it instead operates by warping spacetime, thus bending the path that any test particle may travel. The ISCO is the result of an attractive term in the equation representing the energy of a test particle near the central object. This term cannot be offset by additional angular momentum, and any particle within this radius will spiral into the center. The precise nature of the term depends on the conditions of the central object (i.e. whether a black hole has angular momentum).

== Non-rotating black holes ==
For a non-spinning massive object, where the gravitational field can be expressed with the Schwarzschild metric, the ISCO is located at

$$r_{\mathrm{ms}} = 6 \frac{GM}{c^2} = 3 R_S,$$

where $R_S$ is the Schwarzschild radius of the massive object with mass $M$. Thus, even for a non-spinning object, the ISCO radius is only three times the Schwarzschild radius, $R_S$, suggesting that only black holes and neutron stars have innermost stable circular orbits outside of their surfaces. As the angular momentum of the central object increases, $r_{\mathrm{isco}}$ decreases.

Bound circular orbits are still possible between the ISCO and the so-called marginally bound orbit, which has a radius of

$$r_{\mathrm{mb}} = 4 \frac{GM}{c^2} = {2 R_S},$$

but they are unstable. Between $r_{\mathrm{mb}}$ and the photon sphere so-called unbound orbits are possible which are extremely unstable and which afford a total energy of more than the rest mass at infinity.

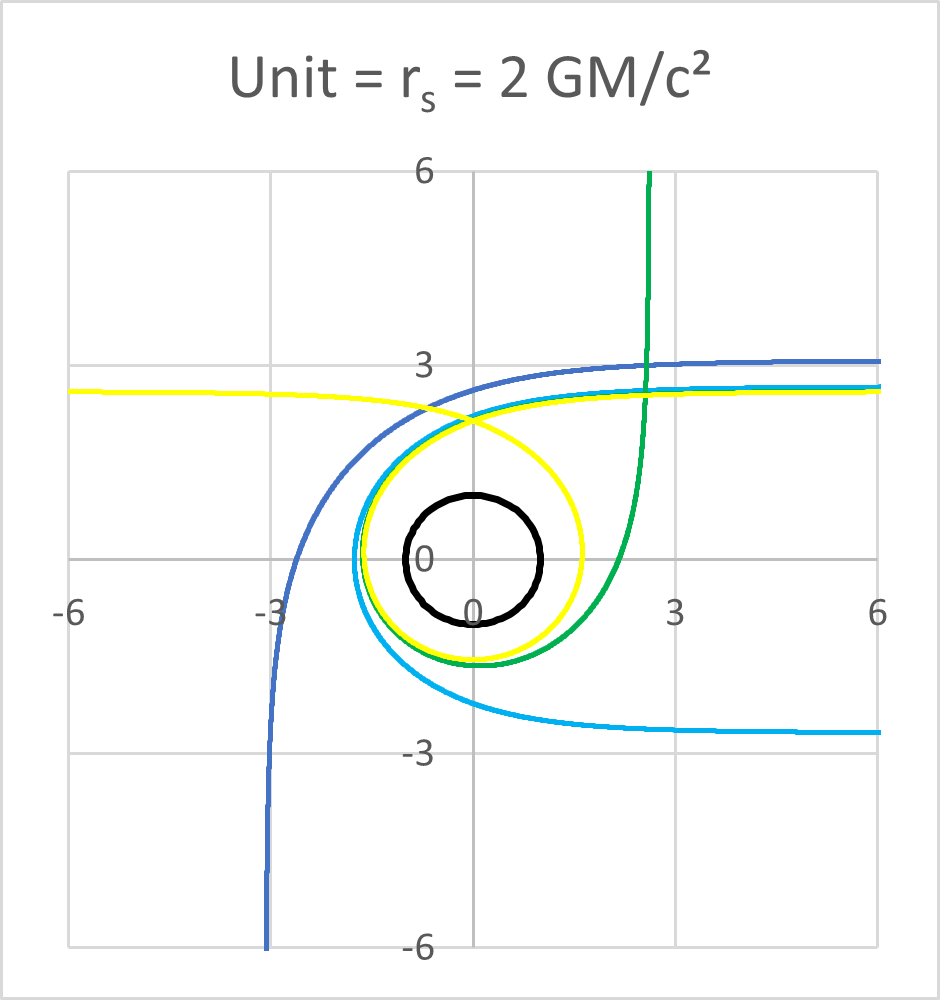
Orbital paths of 4 photons around a Schwarzschild black hole, as measured in Schwarzschild radii.

For a massless test particle like a photon, the only possible but unstable circular orbit is exactly at the photon sphere. Inside the photon sphere, no circular orbits exist. Its radius is

$$r_{\mathrm{ph}} = 3 \frac{GM}{c^2} = {1.5 R_S}.$$

The lack of stability inside the ISCO is explained by the fact that lowering the orbit does not free enough potential energy for the orbital speed necessary: the acceleration gained is too little. This is usually shown by a graph of the orbital effective potential which is lowest at the ISCO.

== Rotating black holes ==
The case for rotating black holes is somewhat more complicated. The equatorial ISCO in the Kerr metric depends on whether the orbit is prograde (negative sign in $r_{\mathrm{ms}}$) or retrograde (positive sign in $r_{\mathrm{ms}}$):

$$r_{\mathrm{ms}} = \frac{GM}{c^2} \left( 3 + Z_2 \pm \sqrt{(3-Z_1)(3+Z_1+2Z_2)} \right) \le 9 \frac{GM}{c^2} = 4.5\,R_S$$

where

$$Z_1 = 1 + \sqrt[3]{1-\chi^2} \left( \sqrt[3]{1+\chi} + \sqrt[3]{1-\chi} \right)$$
$$Z_2 = \sqrt{3\chi^2 + Z_1^2}$$

with the rotation parameter $\chi=2a/R_S=cJ/(M^2G)$.

As the rotation rate of the black hole increases to the maximum of $\chi \to 1$, the prograde ISCO, marginally bound radius and photon sphere radius decrease down to the event horizon radius at the so-called gravitational radius, still logically and locally distinguishable though.

$$r_\mathrm{ms} \to r_\mathrm{mb} \to r_\mathrm{ph} \to r_E \to r_G=GM/c^2$$

The retrograde radii hence increase towards

$$r_\mathrm{ms} \to 9\frac{GM}{c^2} = 4.5\,R_S$$
$$r_\mathrm{mb} = \frac{GM}{c^2}(1+\sqrt{1 \pm \chi})^2 \to (3+\sqrt 8)\frac{GM}{c^2} \approx 2.9142\,R_S$$,
$$r_\mathrm{ph} = 2\frac{GM}{c^2}\left(1+\cos\left(\tfrac{2}{3}\cos^{-1}(\pm \chi)\right)\right) \to 4 \frac{GM}{c^2} = 2\,R_S$$.

If the particle is also spinning there is a further split in ISCO radius depending on whether the spin is aligned with or against the black hole rotation.
