= List of supernova remnants =

This is a list of observed supernova remnants (SNRs) in the Milky Way, as well as galaxies nearby enough to resolve individual nebulae, such as the Large and Small Magellanic Clouds and the Andromeda Galaxy and some nearby galaxies.

Supernova remnants typically only survive for a few tens of thousands of years, making all known SNRs fairly young compared to many other astronomical objects.

== Table ==
| Image | Name | Right ascension | Declination | First visible from Earth | Peak magnitude | Distance (ly) | Type | Galaxy | Remnant |
|---|---|---|---|---|---|---|---|---|---|
| | Sh2-264 or Lambda Orionis Ring | 05^{h} 37^{m} | +09° 30′ | ~1 million years ago | ? | 1,100 | ? | Milky Way | ? |
| | SNR G000.3+00.0 | 17 46 15.0 | -28 38 00 | 500,000 years ago | ? | 27,200-27,700 | ? | Milky Way | ? |
| | Sagittarius A East | 17^{h} 45^{m} 41^{s} | −29° 00′ 48″ | 100,000−35,000 years ago | ? | 26,000 | tidal disruption | Milky Way | ? |
| | LMC B0455-6843 | 04 55 37 | -68 38 47 | ~86,000 years ago | ? | 163,000 | CC? | Milky Way | ? |
| | Monogem Ring (SNR G201.1+08.3) | 06^{h} 59^{m} | +13° 56′ | ~86,000 years ago | ? | 900 | ? | Milky Way | neutron star PSR B0656+14 |
| | SNR J0450.4-7050 | 04^{h} 50^{m} 27^{s} | −70° 50′ 15″ | ~45,000 years ago | ? | 165,000 | core-collapse? | Milky Way | ? |
| | Simeis 147 or Spaghetti Nebula | 05^{h} 39^{m} | +27° 50′ | ~40,000 years ago | 6.5 | 3,000 | ? | Milky Way | neutron star PSR J0538+2817 |
| | IC 443 also known as jellyfish nebulae | 06^{h} 18^{m} 02.7^{s} | +22° 39′ 36″ | ~30,000 years ago | ? | 3,000 | II | Milky Way | neutron star CXOU J061705.3+222127 |
| | SNR J0454.6-6713 | 04 54 33 | .67 13 13 | ~30,000 years ago | ? | 163,000 | Ia | Milky Way | ? |
| | HB 3 (SNR G132.6+01.5) | 02^{h} 17^{m} 40^{s} | +62° 45′ 00″ | 33,000–27,000 years ago | ? | 7,200 | ? | Milky Way | ? |
| | W50 or Manatee Nebula | 19^{h} 12^{m} 20^{s} | +04° 55′ 00″ | ~20,000 years ago | ? | 18,000 | ? | Milky Way | black hole/neutron star SS 433 |
| | 3C 392 (SNR G034.6-00.5/W44/CTB 60) | 18^{h} 56^{m} 10.65^{s} | +01° 13′ 21.3″ | 20,000–16,000 years ago | ? | 10,400 | ? | Milky Way | neutron star PSR B1853+01 |
| | SNR G359.0-0.9 | 17^{h} 45^{m} 30^{s} | −29° 57′ 0″ | 18,000 years ago | ? | 11,000 | ? | Milky Way | ? |
| | SNR 0453-68.5 | 04 53 38 | -68 29 27 | 17,000-13,000 years ago | ? | 163,000 | II | Milky Way | ? |
| | SNR J045447-662528 | 04 54 49 | -65 66 32 | 11,000 years ago | ? | 163,000 | CC? | Milky Way | ? |
| | Vela SNR | 08^{h} 34^{m} | −45° 50′ | 10,300−9,000 BCE | -12? | 815±98 | II | Milky Way | neutron star Vela Pulsar |
| | SNR G359.1-0.5 | 17^{h} 46^{m} 5^{s} | −30° 16′ | ca. 8,000 BCE | ? | 10,500 | ? | Milky Way | ? |
| | SNR 0534-69.9 | 05^{h} 34^{m} 02^{s} | -69° 55' 03" | ca. 8,000 BCE | ? | 163,000 | Ia | Milky Way | ? |
| | SNR G126.2+01.6 | 01^{h} 17^{m} 12^{s} | -41° 46' 45" | 220,000-270,000 years ago | ? | 18,200 | Shell? | Milky Way | ? |
| | CTA 1 | 00^{h} 06^{m} 36^{s} | 72° 47' 00" | ca. 8,000 BCE | ? | 4,600 | ? | Milky Way | pulsar PSR J0007.0+7303 |
| | CTB 1 or Abell 85 | 23^{h} 59^{m} 13^{s} | +62° 26′ 12″ | 9,000–5,500 BCE | ? | 10,100 | ? | Milky Way | neutron star PSR J0002+6216 |
| | Kesteven 79 | 18^{h} 52^{m} 29^{s} | +00° 38′ 42″ | 8600–7000 BCE | ? | 23,000 | ? | Milky Way | neutron star PSR J1852+0040 |
| | Cygnus Loop, including Veil Nebula | 20^{h} 51^{m} | +30° 40′ | 6,000−3,000 BCE | 7 | 1,470 | ? | Milky Way | possible neutron star 2XMM J204920.2+290106 |
| | SNR J050555-680150 | 05 05 55 | -68 01 47 | ~6,200 BCE | ? | 163,000 | ? | Milky Way | ? |
| | 3C 58 | 02^{h} 05^{m} 37.0^{s} | +64° 49′ 42″ | 3500−1500 BCE | ? | 8,000 | ? | Milky Way | pulsar 3C 58 |
| | SNR G344.7-00.1 | 17^{h} 03^{m} 49^{s} | 41° 42′ | ~3,900 -1,900 BCE | ? | 20,547 ± 100 | Ia | Milky Way | ? |
| | LMC N49 | 05^{h} 26^{m} 00.4^{s} | −66° 05′ 02″ | ~3,000 BCE | ? | 160,000 | CC | LMC | neutron star PSR B0525-66 |
| | G299.2-2.9 | 12^{h} 15^{m} 13^{s} | −65° 30′ 00″ | ~2,500 BCE | ? | 16,000 | Ias | Milky Way | none |
| | DEM L71 | 05 05 42 | -62 52 39 | ~2,300 BCE | ? | 160,000 | Ia | LMC | ? |
| | S8 | 01 05 02.7 | +02 08 40 | ~2,400-700 BCE | ? | 2,380,000±70,000 | ? | IC 1613 | ? |
| | SNR G000.9+00.1 | 17 47 18.0 | -28 09 00 | 1,900 years ago | ? | 27,000-33,000 | ? | Milky Way | neutron star PSR J1747-2809 |
| | Puppis A | 08^{h} 24^{m} 07^{s} | −42° 59′ 50″ | ~1,700 BCE | ? | 7,000 | ? | Milky Way | neutron star RX J0822−4300 |
| | G332.4+00.1 | 16^{h} 15^{m} 20^{s} | −50° 42′ 00″ | ~1,000 BCE | ? | 16,800 | ? | Milky Way | neutron star PSR J1614-5048 |
| | G54.1+0.3 | 19^{h} 30^{m} 30^{s} | +18° 52′ 14″ | ~900 BCE | ? | 22,000 | ? | Milky Way | neutron star PSR J1930+1852 |
| | LMC N132D | 05^{h} 25^{m} 1.4^{s} | −69° 38′ 31″ | ~900 BCE | ? | 170,000 | II | LMC | |
| | G292.0+01.8 | 11^{h} 24^{m} 59^{s} | −59° 19′ 10″ | ~800–400 BCE | ? | 17,600 | ? | Milky Way | neutron star PSR J1124-5916 |
| | Kesteven 75 | 18^{h} 46^{m} 25.5^{s} | −02° 59′ 14″ | 1st millennium BCE | ? | 18,900 | ? | Milky Way | neutron star PSR J1846-0258 |
| | G306.3-0.9 | 13^{h} 21^{m} 50.9^{s} | −63° 33′ 50″ | ~400 BCE | ? | 26,000 | Ia | Milky Way | none |
| | RCW 103 | 16^{h} 17^{m} 33^{s} | −51° 02′ 00″ | 1st century | ? | 10,000 | II | Milky Way | neutron star 1E 161348-5055 |
| | SN 185 | 14^{h} 43^{m} 00^{s} | −62° 30′ 00″ | December 7, 185 | ? | 8,200 | Ia | Milky Way | none |
| | SN 386 | 18^{h} 11.5^{m} | −19° 25′ | April/May 386 | ? | 14000-23000 | II | Milky Way | neutron star PSR J1811-1926 |
| | SN 393 | 17^{h} 14^{m} | −39.8° | 27 February 393 | ? | ~9,700 | II/Ib | Milky Way | ? |
| | CTB 37A (SNR G348.5+00.1) | 17^{h} 14^{m} 32^{s} | −38° 29′ | ~500 CE | ? | 25,766 | II | Milky Way | neutron star PSR J1714−3830 |
| | CTB 37B | 17^{h} 13^{m} 43.0^{s} | −38° 10′ 12″ | ~500 CE (April 393?) | ? | 43,000 | ? | Milky Way | neutron star CXOU J171405.7-381031 |
| | E0102-72.3 | 01^{h} 04^{m} 01^{s} | −72° 01′ 52″ | 1st millennium | ? | 190,000 | ? | SMC | neutron star |
| | SNR 0540-69.3 | 05^{h} 40^{m} 10.8^{s} | −69° 19′ 54.2″ | 350–1250 CE | ? | 160,000 | CC | LMC | neutron star PSR J0540−6919 |
| | W49B | 19^{h} 11^{m} 09^{s} | +09° 06′ 24″ | About 1000 CE | ? | 26,000 | Ib or Ic | Milky Way | unidentified black hole |
| | SN 1006 | 15^{h} 02^{m} 22.1^{s} | −42° 05′ 49″ | May 1, 1006 | −7.5 | 7,200 | Ia | Milky Way | none |
| | G350.1-0.3 | 17^{h} 21^{m} 06^{s} | −37° 26′ 50″ | 1000–1100 | ? | 15,000 | ? | Milky Way | neutron star XMMU J172054.5-372652 |
| | SN 1054 or M1 or Crab Nebula | 05^{h} 34^{m} 31.94^{s} | +22° 00′ 52.2″ | July 4, 1054 | −6 | 6,300 | II | Milky Way | neutron star Crab Pulsar |
| | SNR J0519–6902 | | | 450-1500 | ? | 165,000 | Ia | LMC | ? |
| | 3C 397 (SNR G041.1-00.3) | 19^{h} 17^{m} 33^{s} | 07° 08′ | ~270-600 | ? | 27,723 | Ia? | Milky Way | ? |
| | IRAS 00500+6713 (SN 1181) | 0^{h} 53^{m} 11.21^{s} | +67° 30′ 02.4″ | 1181 | ? | 8,000 ± 500 | Iax | Milky Way | none |
| | RX J0852.0-4622 or Vela Junior | 08^{h} 52^{m} 00^{s} | −46° 20′ 00″ | September 13, 1271 (disputed) | ? | >1500 | ? | Milky Way | neutron star CXOU J085201.4–461753 |
| | SGR 1806-20 | 18^{h} 08^{m} 39.32^{s} | −20° 24′ 40.1″ | 1050–1650 | ? | 42,000 | ? | Milky Way | neutron star SGR 1806-20 |
| | SNR 0519-69.0 | 05^{h} 19^{m} 35.14^{s} | −69° 02′ 00.5″ | ca. 1350 | ? | 164,000 | Ia | LMC | ? |
| | SN 1572 or Tycho's Nova | 00^{h} 25^{m} 21.5^{s} | +64° 08′ 27″ | November 11, 1572 | −4 | 7,500 | Ia | Milky Way | none |
| | SN 1604 or Kepler's Nova | 17^{h} 30^{m} 35.98^{s} | −21° 28′ 56.2″ | October 8, 1604 | −2.5 | 20,000 | Ia | Milky Way | none |
| | SNR 0509-67.5 | 05^{h} 09^{m} 31^{s} | −67° 31′ 18″ | ca. 1600 | ? | 160,000 | Ia | LMC | ? |
| | Cassiopeia A | 23^{h} 23^{m} 24^{s} | +58° 48′ 54″ | circa 1667 | 6 | 10,000 | IIb | Milky Way | neutron star CXOU J232327.8+584842 |
| | NGC 2032 (ESO 56-EN160/Seagull Nebula) | 05^{h} 35^{m} 20.0^{s} | −67° 34′ 36″ | 27 September 1826 | ? | 165,000? | II? | LMC | ? |
| | NGC 2060 | 05^{h} 37^{m} 51.6^{s} | −69° 10′ 23″ | 1836 | ? | 160,000 | II | LMC | neutron star PSR J0537−6910 |
| | SN 1885A or S Andromedae | 00^{h} 42^{m} 43.12^{s} | +41° 16′ 03.2″ | August 20, 1885 | 6 | 2,500,000 | I pec | Andromeda Galaxy | none |
| | G1.9+0.3 | 17^{h} 48^{m} 46.1^{s} | −27° 09′ 50.9″ | circa 1898 | ? | 25,000 | Ia | Milky Way | none |
| | G290.1-0.8 (MSH 11-61A) | 10^{h} 59^{m} 25.36^{s} | −61° 18′ 42.6″ | ? | ? | ? | II | Milky Way | neutron star? |
| | Honeycomb Nebula | 05^{h} 35^{m} 46.0^{s} | −69° 18′ 00″ | ? | ? | 150,000 | II? | Milky Way | ? |
| | Antlia Supernova Remnant | | | | ? | 300–1,000 | II | Milky Way | neutron star |
| | N103B (SNR 0509–68.7) | 05^{h} 08^{m} 40.0^{s} | −68° 45′ 12.0″ | ? | ? | 168,000 | Ia | LMC | ? |
| | SN 1987A | 05^{h} 35^{m} 28.02^{s} | −69° 16′ 11.1″ | February 24, 1987 | 3 | 168,000 | II-P | LMC | neutron star |
| | SN 1979C | 12^{h} 22^{m} 58.58^{s} | +15° 47′ 52.7″ | 1979 | ? | 50,000,000 | II | M100 | neutron star |
| | SN 1998S | 11^{h} 46^{m} 06.25^{s} | +47° 28′ 55.5″ | 2 March 1998 | ? | 50,000,000 | IIn | NGC 3877 | ? |
| | SN 2003gd | 01^{h} 36^{m} 42.65^{s} | +15° 44′ 20.9″ | 12 June 2003 | ? | 30,300,000 | II-P | M74 | neutron star? |
| | SN 2020jfo | 4^{h} 28^{m} 54.05^{s} | +12° 21′ 50.480″ | May 6, 2020 | ? | 52,500,000 | II | M61 | ? |
| | SN 2020fqv | 12^{h} 36^{m} 33.260^{s} | +11° 13′ 53.87″ | March 31, 2020 | ? | 60,000,000 | IIb | NGC 4568 | neutron star |
| | SN 2023rve | 02^{h} 46^{m} 18.13^{s} | −30° 14′ 22.2″ | September 8, 2023 | ? | 45,000,000 | II | NGC 1097 | ? |
| | G305.4–2.2 (Teleios) | | | | ? | 7,000 or 25,000 | Ia | Milky Way | |
| | G115.5+9.1 (Scylla) | | | | ? | ? | II | Milky Way | |

== See also ==
- List of supernovae
- Supernova
- Lists of astronomical objects
