= Teleio =

Teleios (Greek: τέλειος) is a Greek adverb for perfect(ed/ion), last, end(ed/ing), finish(ed).

Teleio or teleios may refer to:

== Religion ==
- Teleios, Christian perfection
- Zeus Teleios, a baetylic idol found in Tegea, Arcadia, Peloponnese, Greece
- Teleios Theological Training Institute, a university in Nassau

== Arts, entertainment, media ==
- Teleios (sculpture), a bronze carving by Giacomo Benevilli
- Teleios (film), a 2017 science fiction film also called Beyond the Trek
- Teleios, a fictional private military contractor from the 2020 U.S. film Project Power

== Other uses ==
- G305.4–2.2 (Teleios), a near perfect radio circle supernova remnant
- TELEIOS, a virtual observatory featuring the TerraSAR-X archive
- Teleio, slang for teleiophile; having propensity for adults

== See also ==
- Perfect (disambiguation)
- Ending (disambiguation)
- Finish (disambiguation)
- Last (disambiguation)
