= G54.1+0.3 =

Supernova remnant in the constellation Sagitta

Supernova remnant
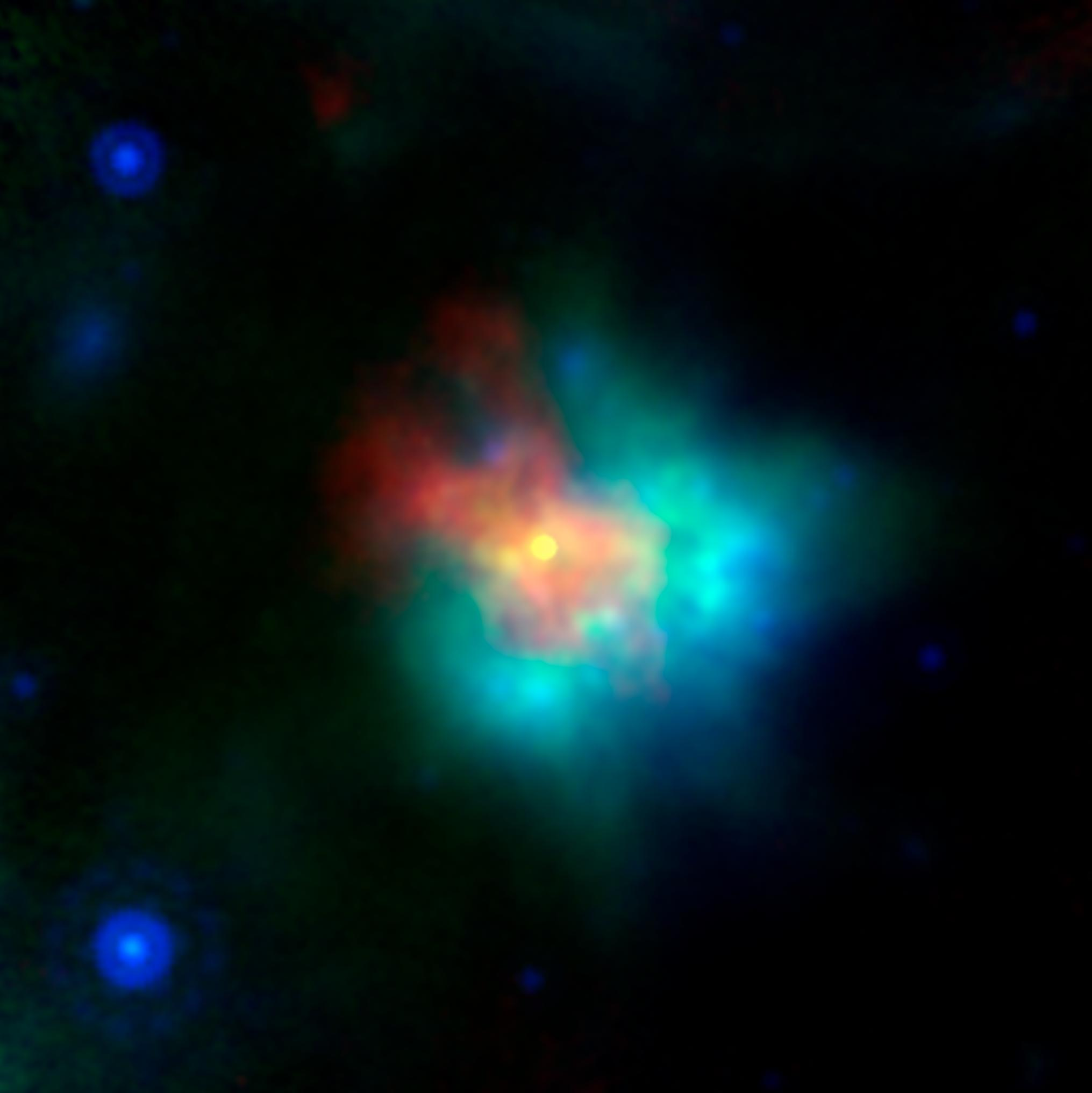

Observation data: J2000 epoch
- Right ascension: 19^{h} 30^{m} 10.6^{s}
- Declination: +18° 50′ 22″
- Designations: PSR J1930+1852

SNR G054.1+00.3, also called G54.1+0.3, 2E 4258 and 2E 1928.3+1846 is a supernova remnant located in the constellation Sagitta. It was identified as a supernova remnant in a study of the galactic plane in the radio continuum at wavelengths of 21 and 11 cm.

== Morphology ==
SNR G054.1+00.3 is identified as a supernova remnant by its non-thermal radio emission with strong linear polarization. It has a small angular radius (1.5 arcminutes) in radio and X-ray images. Its X-ray emission has been detected with the Einstein, ASCA, ROSAT and Chandra telescopes. In this region of the electromagnetic spectrum it presents different structures that include a ring, an outer nebula and a pulsar, called PSR J1930+1852. The period of this pulsar is 136 ms and it emits very high energy gamma rays. There is a nebula caused by the stellar wind coming from it (PWN).

CO observations show that there is no interaction between SNR G054.1+00.3 and the surrounding clouds and that it instead appears to be located within a bubble. Likewise, in a study carried out in the infrared region at 21 μm, features similar to those observed in Cassiopeia A appear, probably attributable to SiO2 grains. Recently formed cold dust (with a temperature of only 27 - 44 K) has also been detected.

Various models that consider the amount of dust and its composition suggest that the progenitor star was part of a massive star cluster and had a mass of 15 - 20 solar masses or 16 - 27 solar masses.

== Distance ==
SNR G054.1+00.3 is a young supernova remnant. According to various studies, it has an age between 2100 and 3600 years, between 1500 and 3000 years, or 1700 years. On the other hand, the distance at which it is located is not well known either. Various works place this supernova remnant at a distance between 5,000 and 10,000 parsecs; a commonly accepted value is 6200 (+3800, -1200) parsecs.

== See also ==
- List of supernova remnants
- Lists of astronomical objects
