= G306.3-0.9 =

Supernova remnant

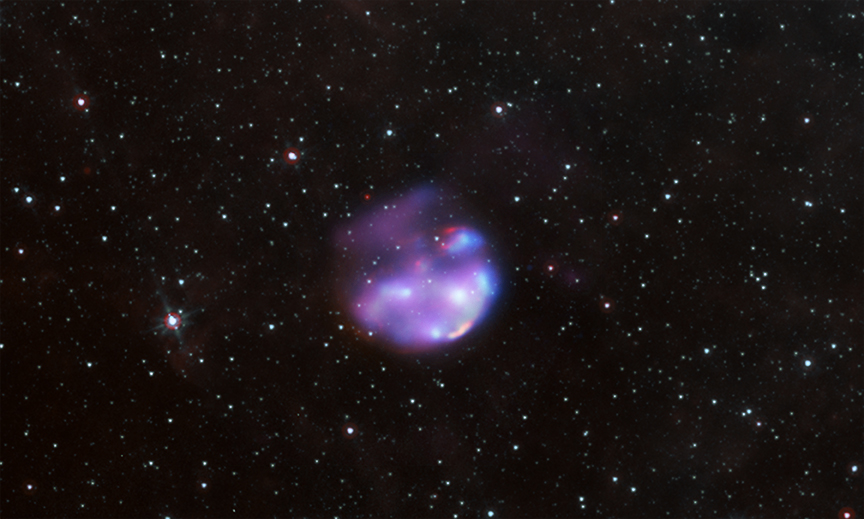
- Event type: Supernova remnant
- Ia
- Constellation: Centaurus
- Right ascension: 13h 21m 51s
- Declination: -63°34′
- Epoch: J2000
- Galactic coordinates: G306.3-00.9
- Distance: 20,000 parsecs
- Other designations: SNR G306.3-00.9, SWIFT J132150.9-633350

SNR G306.3-00.9, also called G306.3-0.9 is a supernova remnant located in the constellation Centaurus. It was discovered by the Swift Space Observatory in 2011.

== Morphology ==
The first observations carried out with the Chandra X-ray Observatory revealed that SNR G306.3-00.9 has a distorted morphology, brighter towards the southwest. The strong radio and X-ray emission from this area suggests either that there is interaction with an interstellar cloud or that it is the consequence of an asymmetric supernova explosion. Emission from highly ionized atoms of magnesium, silicon, sulfur and argon, and suggests that it is the remnant of a Type Ia supernova. Such a spectrum can be described by a non-equilibrium ionization plasma with a temperature below 1 keV. In infrared images at 24 μm, the morphology of the dust grains impacted by the shock wave is shell-shaped, coinciding with the distribution observed in hard X-rays. At 70 μm the dust emission is concentrated in the south, with very little dust in the northwest.

== Distance ==
The age of SNR G306.3-00.9 is not well known. It was initially estimated that it could be approximately 2,500 years old—a very young supernova remnant—considering that it was 8,000 parsecs away. A later study, which compares the X-ray absorption column with the distribution of H I decomposed along the line of sight, gives it a distance of around 20,000 parsecs, so its age may be 6000 years and evolutionarily it would be in the late Sedov phase. According to this, the most probable location of SNR G306.3-00.9 is in the outer extension of the Perseus arm. However, according to other models, its age could be considerably older, 12,800 (+2500, − 2500) years.

== See also ==
- List of supernova remnants
- 2011 in science
