= 3C 392 =

Superovae remnant interacting with a molecular cloud

Supernova remnant 3C 392
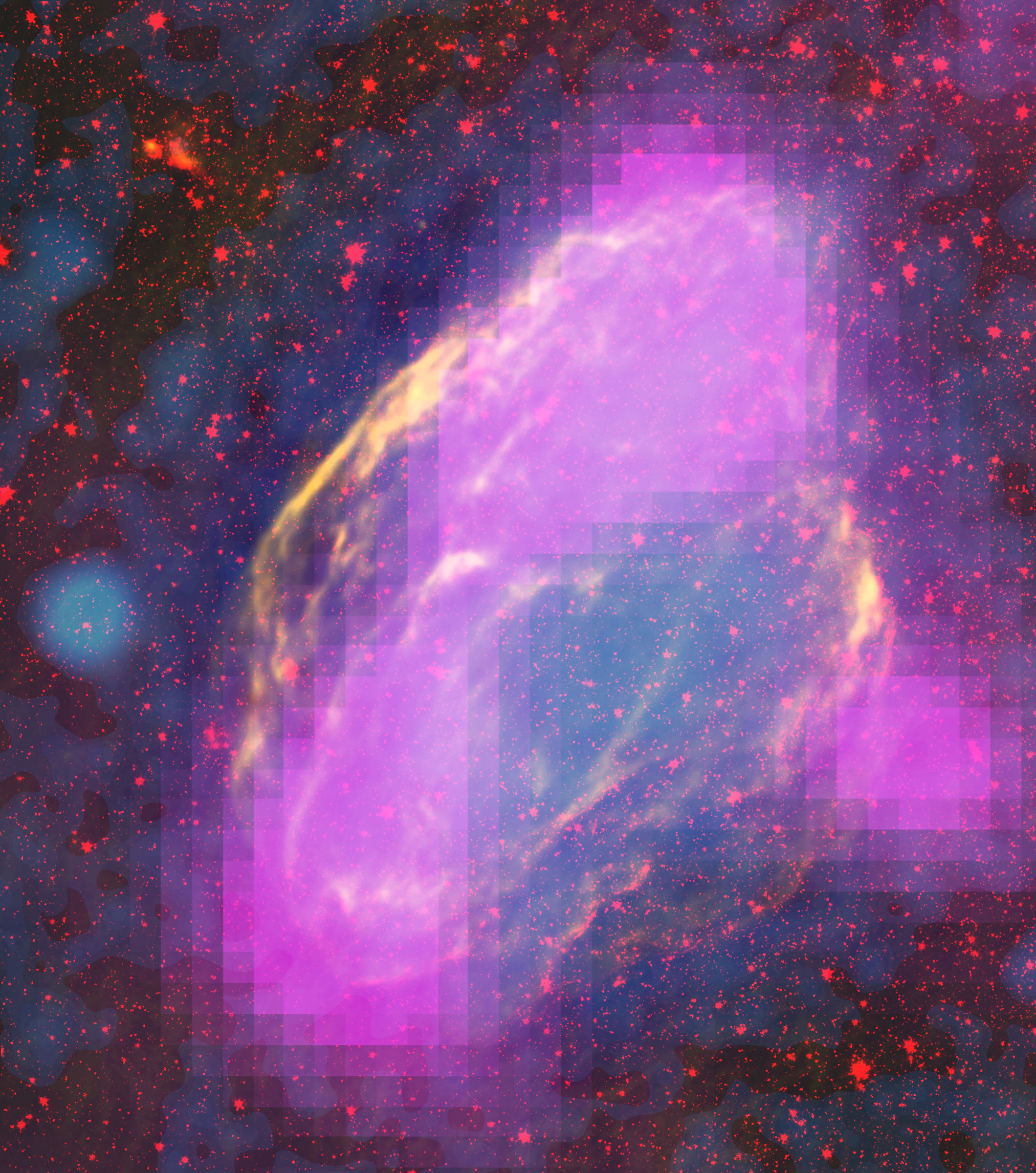
- Event type: Supernova remnant
- Type II (?)
- Constellation: Aquila
- Right ascension: 18^{h} 56^{m} 11^{s}
- Epoch: J2000
- Galactic coordinates: G034.6-00.5
- Distance: ~3,000 parsecs
- Remnant: PSR B1853+01
- Notable features: Interaction with a molecular cloud
- Related media on Commons

3C 392 (also known as SNR G034.6-00.5, W44 and CTB 60) is a supernova remnant located in the constellation Aquila. It was discovered by Gart Westerhout in 1958 as part of a study of continuous radiation in the Milky Way at a frequency of 1390 MHz.

== Morphology ==
3C 392 is a supernova remnant of mixed morphology characterized by a bright radio-band shell and concentrated thermal X-ray emission from its center. In the radio band, 3C 392 has the appearance of a quasi-elliptic asymmetric bright shell, its emission being most intense along the eastern boundary; in the western region a bright arc can be seen. In the X-ray spectrum it presents continuums of radiant recombination of highly ionized atoms, a common characteristic of other remnants with mixed morphology. The emission is predominantly thermal, which is based on the presence of magnesium, silicon and sulfur emission lines. Likewise, the emission in hard X-rays has an arc-shaped structure that is correlated in space with the filament seen in the radio band. 3C 392 has also been detected in gamma rays, probably originating from the decay of neutral pions.

3C 392 is one of the few demonstrated cases of interaction between a supernova remnant and a molecular cloud, as corroborated by observations of OH masers at 1720 MHz. Two stellar objects have been discovered at the interface between 3C 392 and an H II region massive youth.

== Remnant ==
3C 392 is associated with the pulsar PSR B1853+01, located to the south of the rest of the supernova, indicating that 3C 392 comes from a core collapse (CC) supernova. The wind from the pulsar has created a small synchrotron nebula (PWN) observed in both radio frequencies and X-rays.

== Age and distance ==
The age of 3C 392, evaluated by the characteristic age of the associated pulsar, is approximately 20,000 years. Another different estimate, calculated by the age of the thermal plasma, 16,700 ± 2,500 years, is comparable to the previous value; however, its dynamic age—based on the speed and size of the shock wave—is considerably higher, although it is subject to a wide margin of error (55,000 ± 20,000 years).

3C 392 is located at a distance between 2200 and 3000 parsecs, and is located in a complex region of the inner galactic plane. It is immersed in the W48 molecular cloud complex, a rich region of star formation.

== See also ==
- List of supernova remnants
- IC 443
