= Kesteven 79 =

Supernova remnant

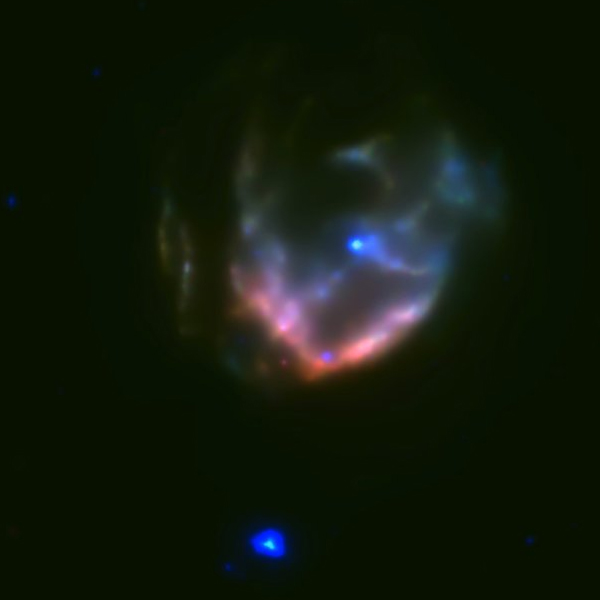
- Kesteven 79 supernova remnant image from ESA
- Right ascension: 18^{h} 52^{m} 48^{s}
- Declination: +00° 41′
- Epoch: J2000.0
- Distance: 7,000 parsecs (23,000 ly)
- Other designations: Kes 79, 4C00.70, HC13, G33.6+0.1

Kes 79 (G33.6+0.1) is a supernova remnant. It is located in the constellation Aquila, preceding LDN617 (Lynds Dark Nebula 617).

== See also ==
- List of supernova remnants
