= N103B =

Supernova remnant in the constellation Mensa

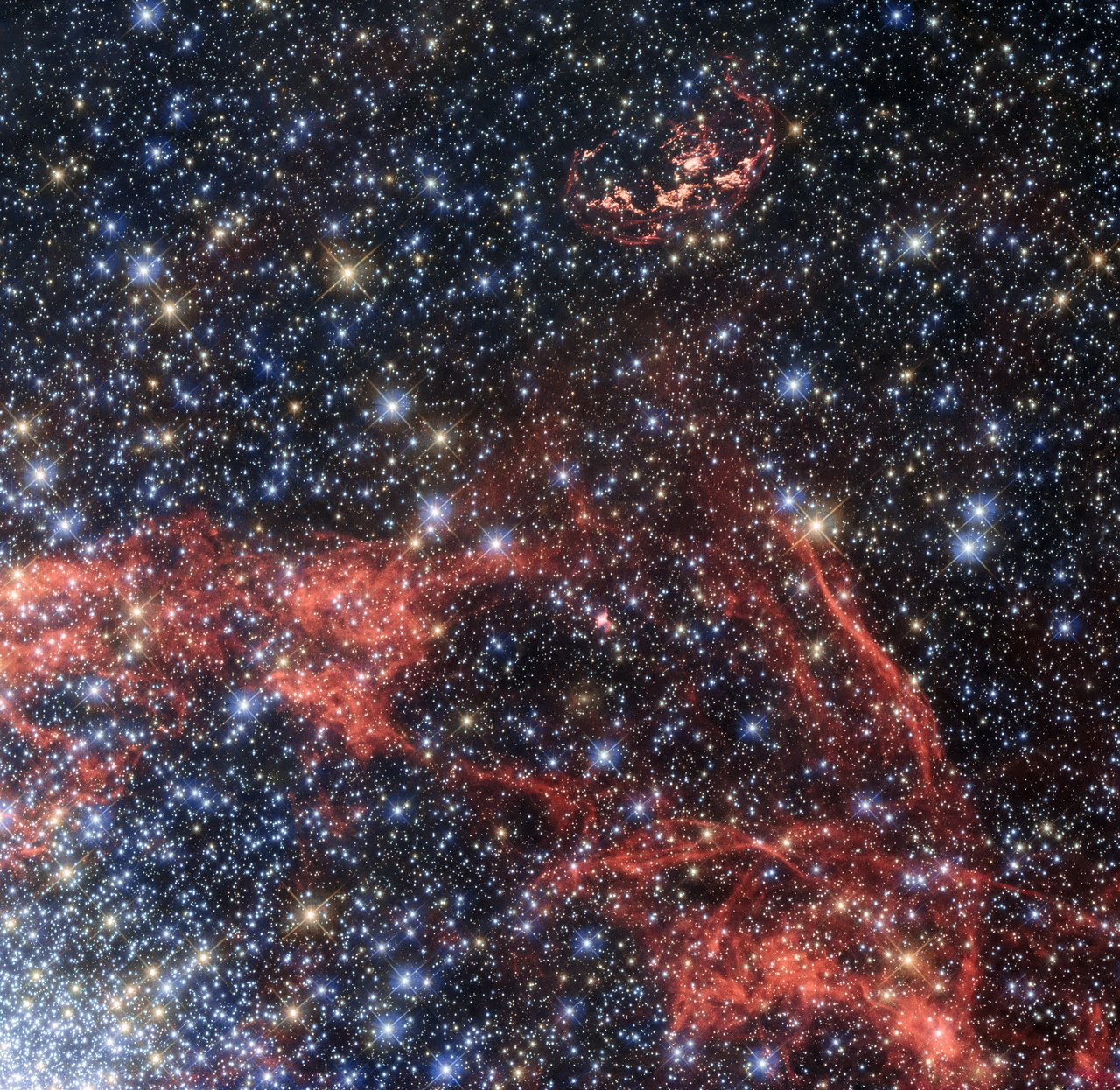
- Under Debate
- Constellation: Mensa
- Right ascension: 05h 08m 40.0
- Declination: -68d 45m 12.0
- Epoch: J2000
- Galactic coordinates: Large Magellanic Cloud
- Other designations: SNR 0509-68.7

N103B (also known as SNR 0509–68.7) is a supernova remnant located in the Large Magellanic Cloud. It is relatively close to Earth, allowing astronomers to observe and study the remnant. It lies a short distance from NGC 1850. The exact type of supernova that produced N103B is under speculation, but has been widely accepted to be a Type Ia supernova. It is within the boundaries of the constellation Mensa.

== Morphology ==
The orange-red filaments visible in the image show the shock fronts of the initial supernova explosion. These filaments have allowed astronomers to calculate the original barycenter of the explosion. The filaments also show that the explosion is no longer expanding as a sphere, but is elliptical in shape. Astronomers assume that part of material ejected by the explosion interacting with an extremely dense cloud of interstellar material, which slowed its speed. N103B is theorized to be interacting with dense circumstellar matter.

A double-ring structure is visible within N103B, implying that it expands into an hourglass-shaped cavity and forms bipolar bubbles.

== Supernova ==
Using the Chandra Telescope, astronomers observed N103B to figure out the initial supernova type. Due to the type of material and the amount of specific materials within N103B, astronomers were able to support the widely accepted belief that it was formed from a Type Ia supernova.

== See also ==
- List of supernova remnants
- List of supernovae
