= Kesteven 75 =

Supernova remnant in the constellation Aquila

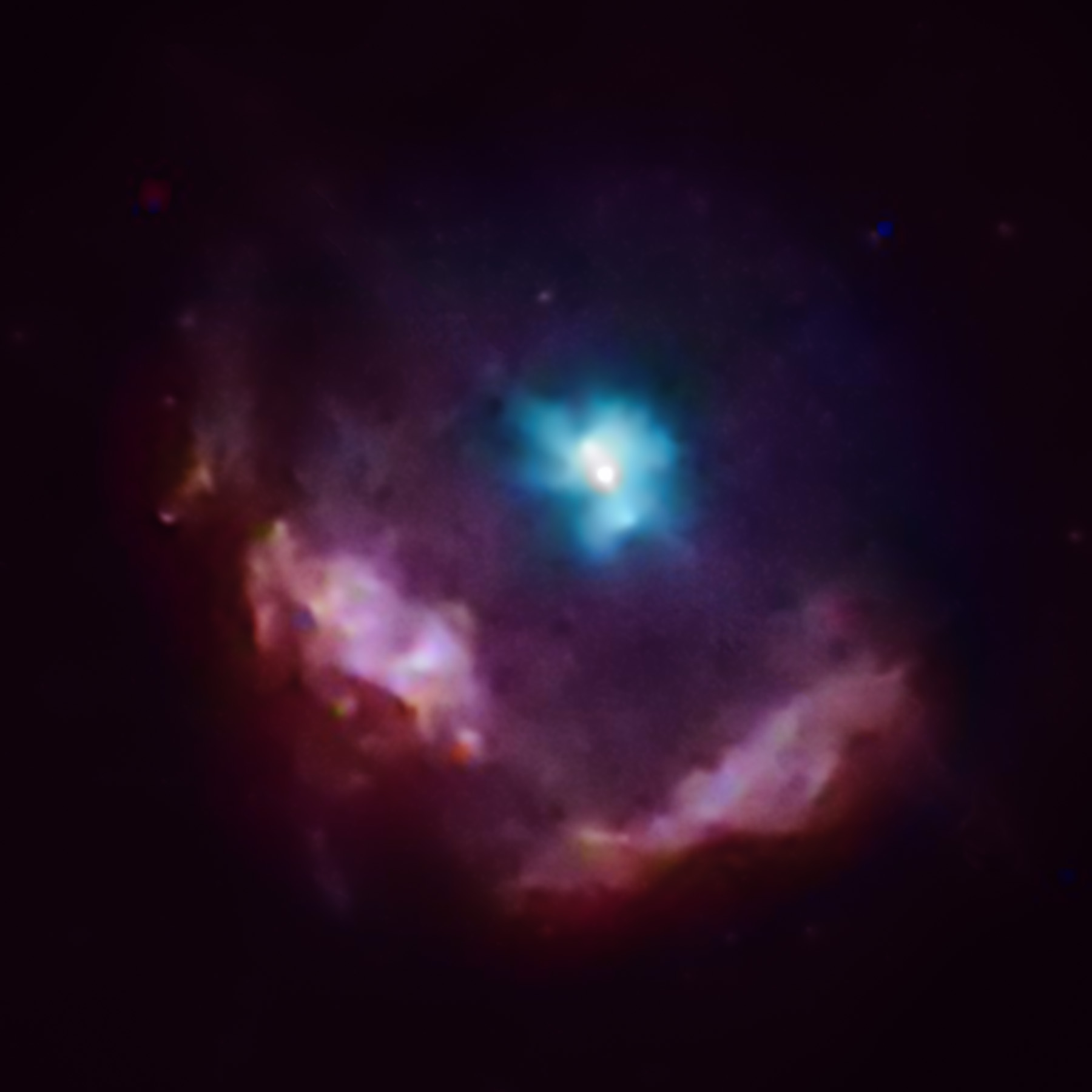
- Kesteven 75, as photographed by the Chandra X-Ray Observatory Telescope
- Event type: Supernova remnant
- Right ascension: 18h 46m 26s
- Declination: -02°59′
- Epoch: J2000
- Galactic coordinates: G029.7-00.2
- Distance: 5800 ± 500 pc
- Other designations: Cul 1843-030, HSNH 85, 2E 4129, SNR G029.7-00.2, SNR G029.7-00.3, 4C -03.70, AJG 86, ASB 44, Cul 1843-03, GAL 029.7-00.2, GAL 029.7-00.3, GPS 1843-031, Kes 75, NEK 29.7-00.2, NRAO 580, RFS 490, GPSR 029.690-0.242, 2E 1843.8-0301, GRS G029.70 -00.30, [ADD2012] SNR 11, [PBD2003] G029.7-00.2, [ADP79] 029.701-0.246, F3R 1025, PMN J1846-0259, TXS 1843-030
- Related media on Commons

Kesteven 75, abbreviated as Kes 75 and also called SNR G029.7-00.3, G29.7-0.3 and 4C -03.70, is a supernova remnant located in the constellation Aquila.

== Morphology ==
Kesteven 75 is a supernova remnant of composite morphology. In the radio band, it shows a shell or partial shell of about 90 arcseconds in radius, with a central nebula of about 25 × 35 arcseconds. The complete absence of emission in the eastern part indicates a strong density gradient of the interstellar medium where Kesteven 75 expands. The central component has been observed to have a flat radio spectrum with substantial polarization, which is characteristic of a pulsar or plerion wind nebula. The expansion speed of this plerion is approximately 1000 km/s.

X-ray observations with the ASCA and Chandra observatories also show the composite nature of Kesteven 75, its morphology being very similar to that of radio frequencies. The emission from the shell of Kesteven 75 is mainly concentrated in two regions, to the southeast and southwest. Likewise, a "jet"-torus structure, common in young plerions, has been identified. According to certain observations of Chandra, the spectra of the shell can be explained by a thermal model of two temperatures, possibly associated on the one hand with the impacted material, and on the other with the ejecta material that has suffered a second impact due to the reverse shock.

The infrared emission from the shell is spatially correlated with the X-ray emission, suggesting that the dust particles are heated by the collision of gas previously heated by the X-rays. This dust reaches a temperature of 140 K due to upon collision with a hot and relatively dense plasma.

Kesteven 75 has also been detected in the gamma ray region between 20 and 200 keV with the INTEGRAL space observatory, and between 0.3 and 5 TeV with the H.E.S.S telescope system.

== Progenitor ==
Based on the high velocity of the ejecta and the low density implied by the initially estimated distance (much greater than currently accepted), it has been suggested that Kesteven 75 comes from a type Ib/c supernova explosion. However, subsequent studies have proposed that Kesteven 75 is probably the result of a more common type IIP supernova, where the plerion expands into an asymmetric nickel bubble. The parent star is thought to have a mass between 8 and 12 solar masses.

== Stellar remnant ==
Kesteven 75 houses the X-ray pulsar PSR J1846−025, discovered in 2000, which provides energy to the plerion. It is a highly energetic stellar remnant (E = 8.3 × 1036 erg/s) whose rotation period is 325 ms. In 2006, it was detected that this pulsar was in an "active" or "flaring" state, which led to changes in its spectrum, as well as in the morphology of the associated plerion; Fourteen years later, activity was detected again in PSR J1846−025. However, the energetic and spectral properties of this pulsar firmly distinguish it from a magnetar. Its inferred magnetic field (Bs = 4.9 × 1013 G) is the largest among this type of objects, and is probably responsible for the activity intervals discovered, suggesting a transition to a magnetar state.

== Distance ==
Although historically estimates of the distance to Kesteven 75 have varied significantly between 5,000 and 21,000 parsecs, recent analyzes based on H I observations place this supernova remnant at 5,800 ± 500 parsecs from Earth. On the other hand, Kesteven 75 is a very young supernova remnant, with an age of less than 840 years. The study of the expansion of the plerion over 10 years has allowed us to limit the age of this remnant to 480 ± 50 years. Consequently, Kesteven 75 contains the youngest plerion in our galaxy.

== See also ==
- List of supernova remnants
