= PSR J0538+2817 =

Pulsar in the constellation Taurus

Observation data Epoch J2000 Equinox ICRS
- Constellation: Taurus
- Right ascension: 05^{h} 38^{m} 25.06^{s}
- Declination: 28° 17′ 09.1″

Astrometry
Distance	3,900 ly (1,200 pc)

Details
Rotation	0.14315825891177 s
Age	30,000±4,000 years

Other designations
- PSR B0535+28, NVSS J053825+281717

Database references
SIMBAD	data

PSR J0538+2817 is a pulsar situated in the constellation of Taurus. Discovered in 1996, it stirred interest from the fact that it is physically linked to the supernova remnant SNR G180.8–02.2. It completes spin every 0.1431 seconds.

The characteristic age of PSR J0538+2817 gives an older estimate: 618,000 years. However, observation of the pulsar's proper motion gives a much younger result: 30,000±4,000 years, meaning that the pulsar must have begun rotating at a relatively slow pace, at 0.139 seconds.
