= G290.1−0.8 =

Supernova remnant in Carina

Nebula
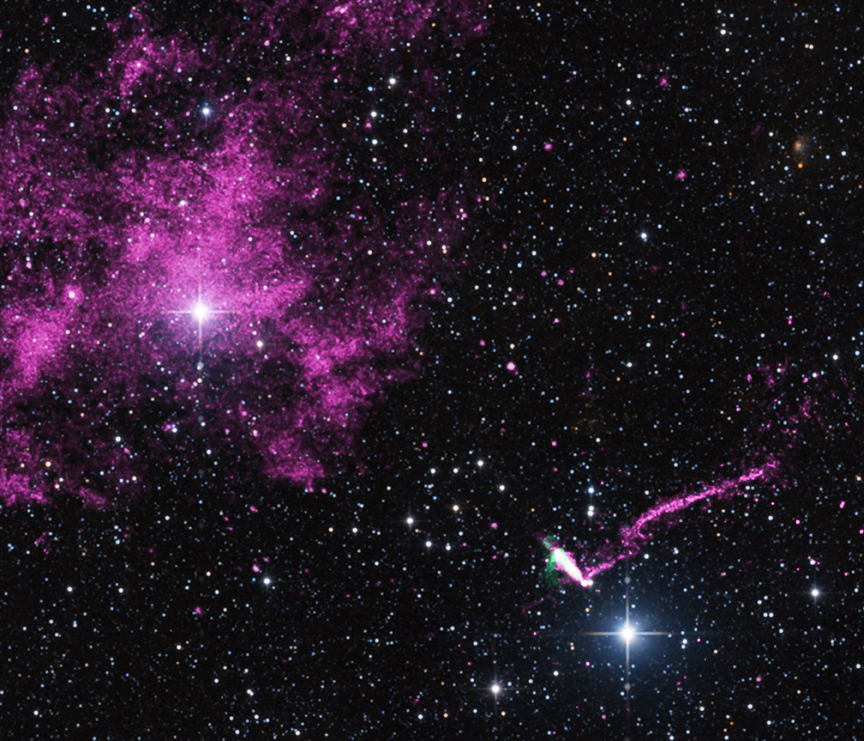
- Composite image of IGR J11014−6103 and MSH 11−61A that contains data from NASA's Chandra X-ray Observatory (purple), radio data from the Australia Compact Telescope Array (green), and optical data from the 2MASS survey (red, green, and blue)

Observation data: J2000 epoch
- Right ascension: 10^{h} 59^{m} 25.36^{s}
- Declination: −61° 18′ 42.6″
- Constellation: Carina
- Notable features: Possible undiscovered neutron star and two bright spots

G290.1−0.8 (also known as MSH 11−61A) is a supernova remnant in the constellation Carina. It is located in the Galactic plane of the galaxy in the Carina arm.

The supernova remnant has two bright spots opposite each other on a symmetry axis running towards north west-south east direction. These bright spots are not homogeneous with the rest of the supernova remnant, and have not reached ionization equilibrium yet. This suggests that there might be a neutron star that has not been discovered yet. The rest of the supernova remnant originated from a high mass star that went supernova with a possible strong bipolar wind.
