= LMC N132D =

Supernova Remnant in the Large Magellanic Cloud

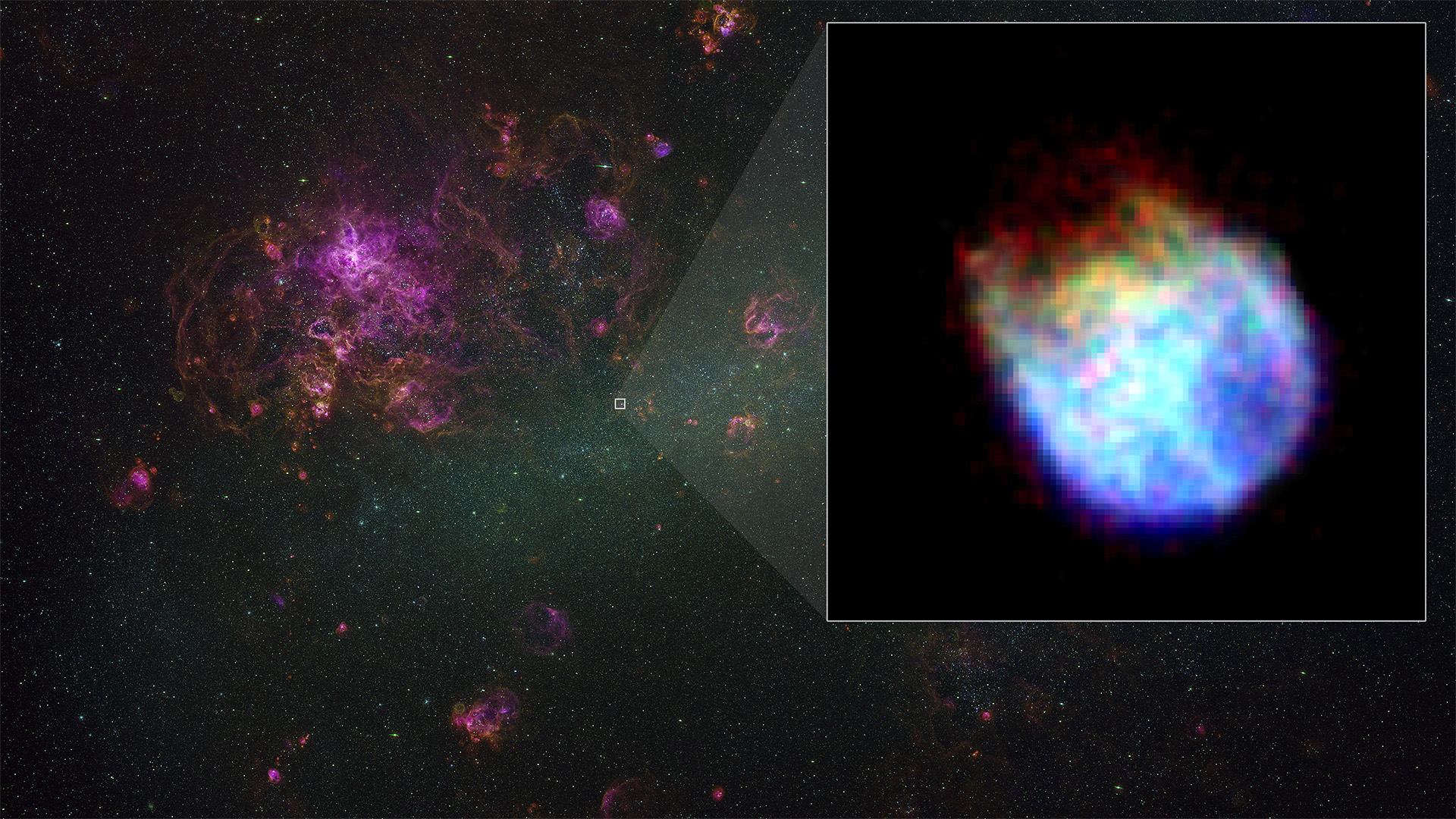
- Event type: Supernova remnant
- II
- Constellation: Dorado
- Right ascension: 05h 25m 1.4s
- Declination: -69° 38' 31.0"
- Epoch: J2000
- Galactic coordinates: Large Magellanic Cloud
- Other designations: LMC N132D, SNR J052501-693842, IRAS 05240-6948
- Related media on Commons

LMC N132D (also known as SNR J052501-693842) is a prominent supernova remnant (SNR) located in the Large Magellanic Cloud (LMC), a satellite galaxy of the Milky Way Galaxy, in the constellation of Dorado. It lies approximately 170,000 light-years (52,000 parsecs) away. It is one of the brightest and most studied oxygen-rich SNRs in the LMC, known for its complex morphology and high-energy emissions across multiple wavelengths.

== Observation ==
LMC N132D is a very high-energy (VHE) gamma-ray source, detected by the High Energy Stereoscopic System (H.E.S.S.) with an angular resolution of ~0.05 degrees. Its power-law spectrum extends beyond 8 TeV without a cutoff, unusual for a remnant of its age, making it a key target for studying particle acceleration in mature SNRs. It is located near the center of the galaxy, 1.5 degrees west of the Tarantula Nebula . The nebula emits X-rays, and its material travels at a speed of 2000 km/s.

== Significance ==
LMC N132D offers critical insights into core-collapse supernovae, shock interactions with the interstellar medium, and non-thermal processes in SNRs. Its oxygen-rich ejecta and association with molecular clouds provide clues about the progenitor star's environment and evolution. The remnant's gamma-ray emission challenges models of particle acceleration, as its mature age contrasts with its high-energy output.

== Gallery ==
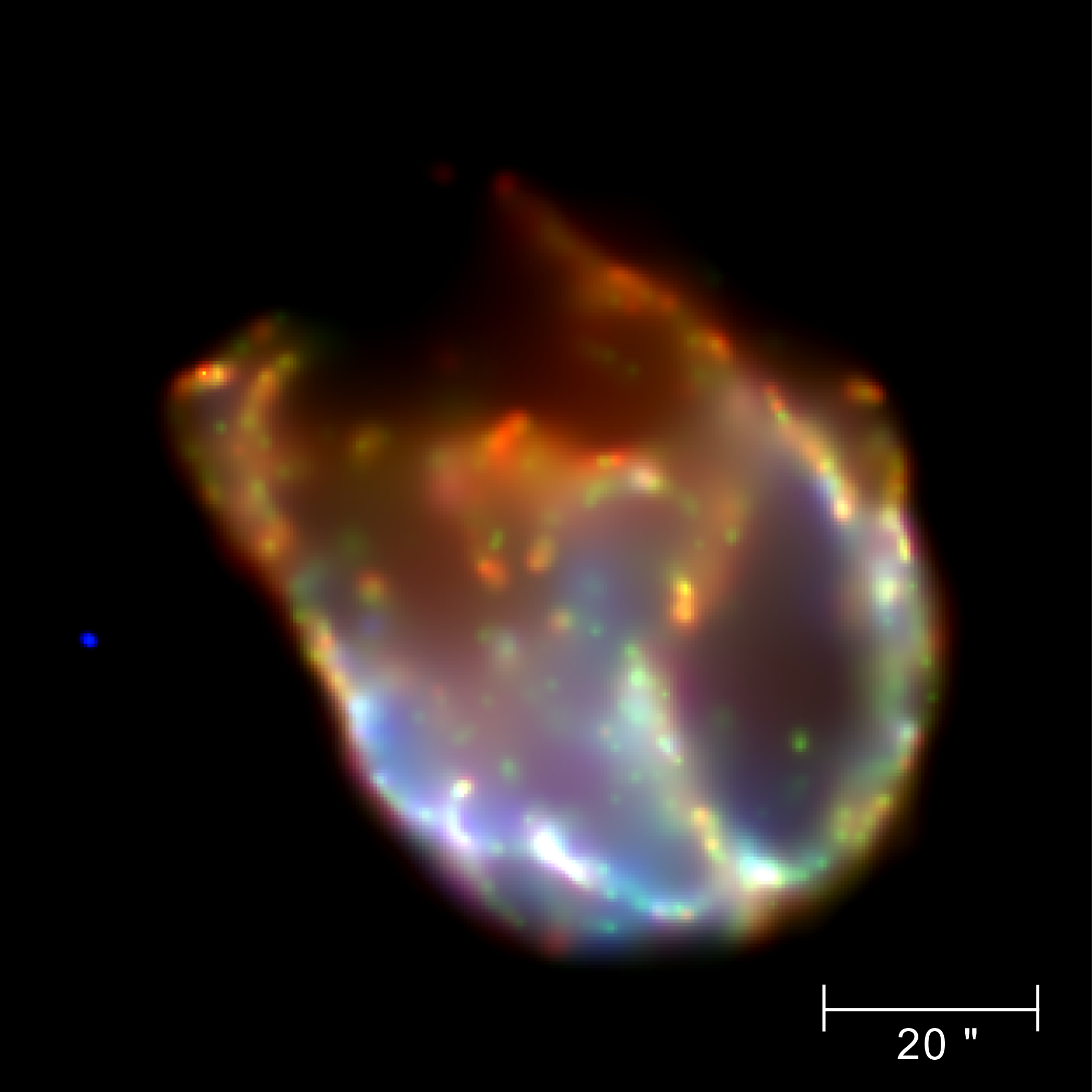

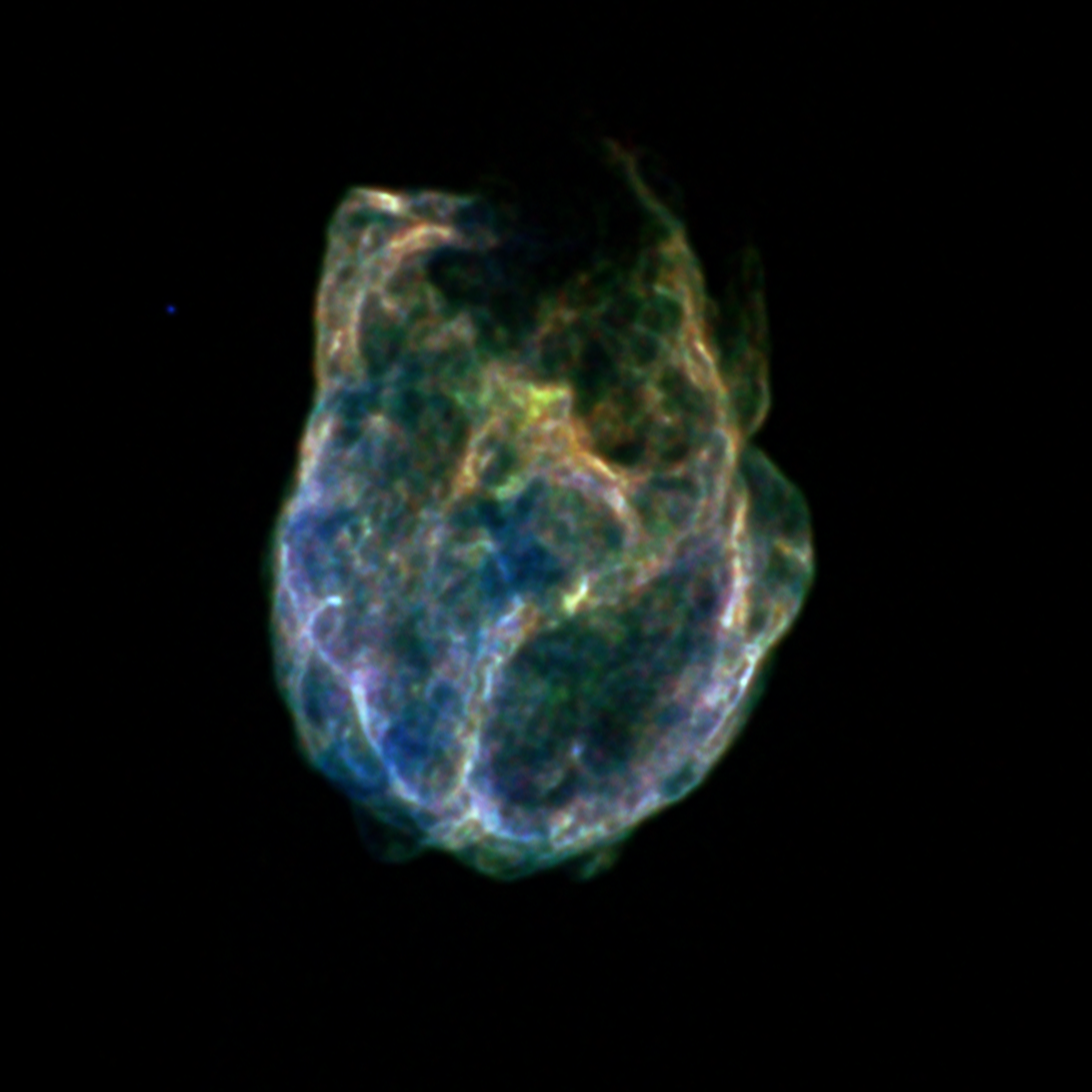

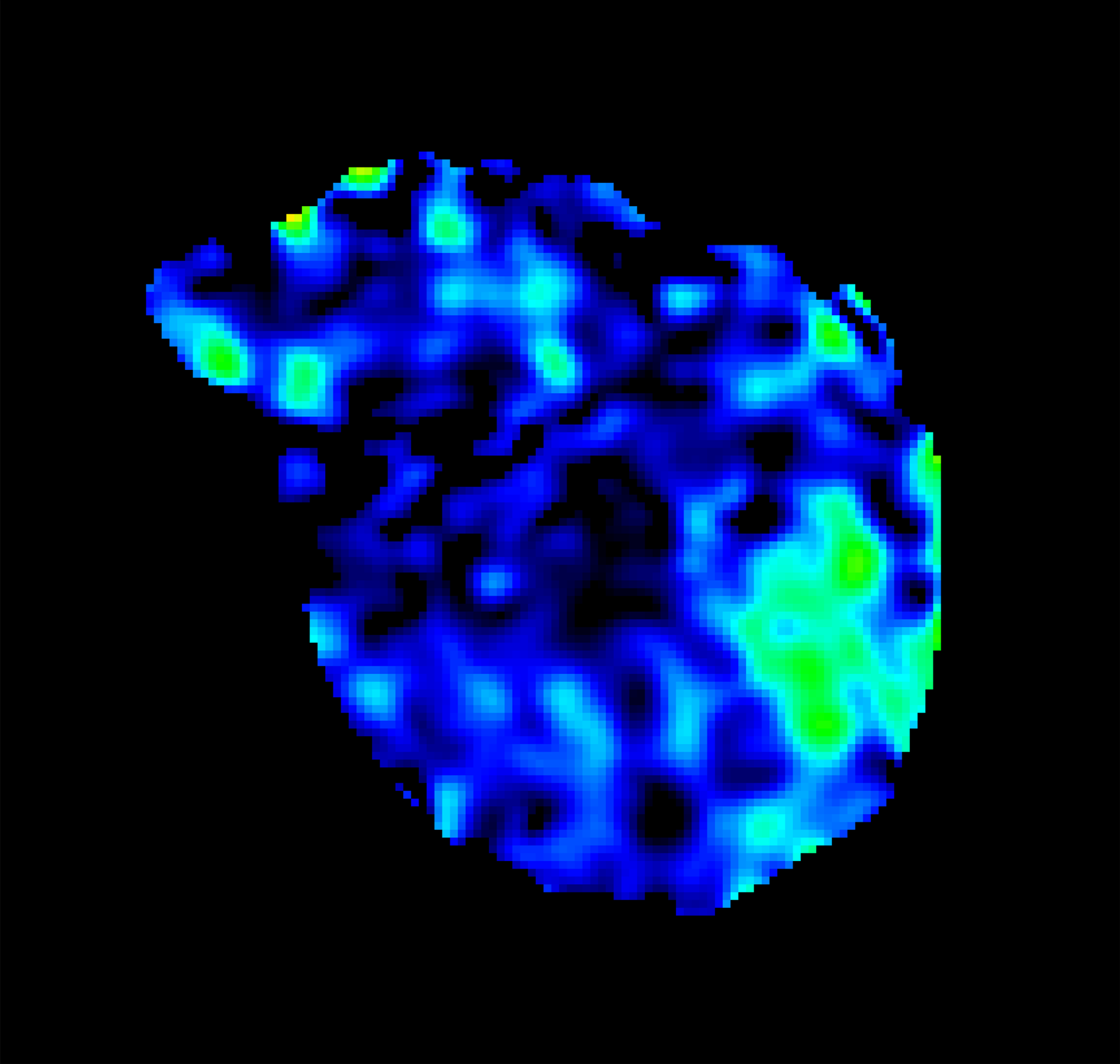

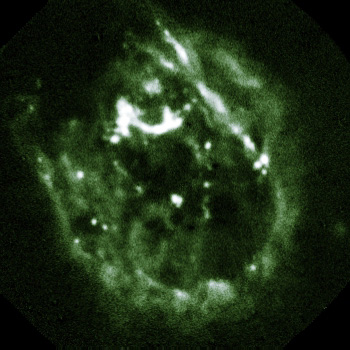

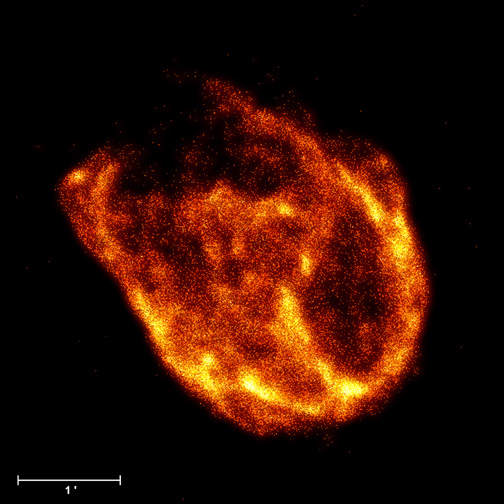

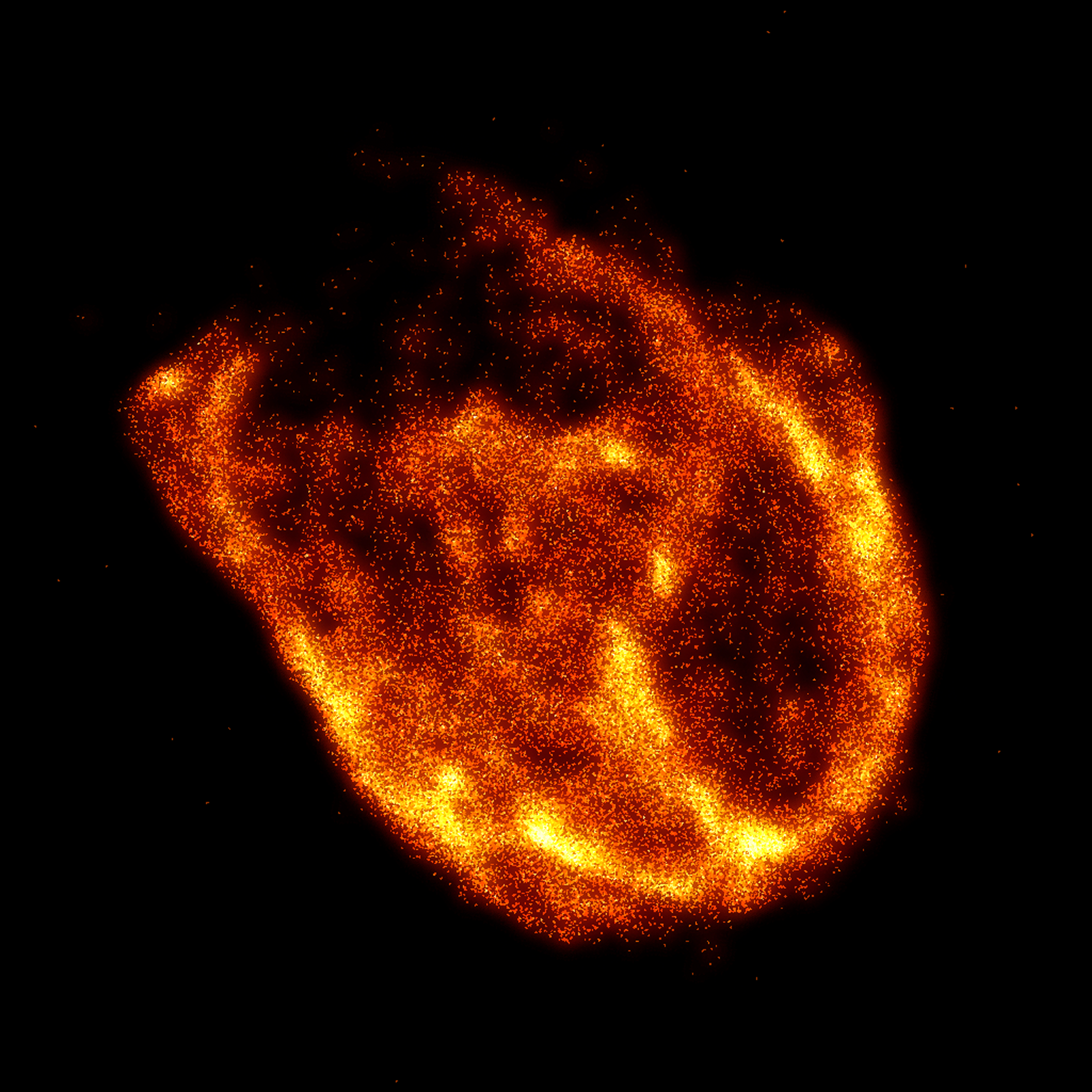

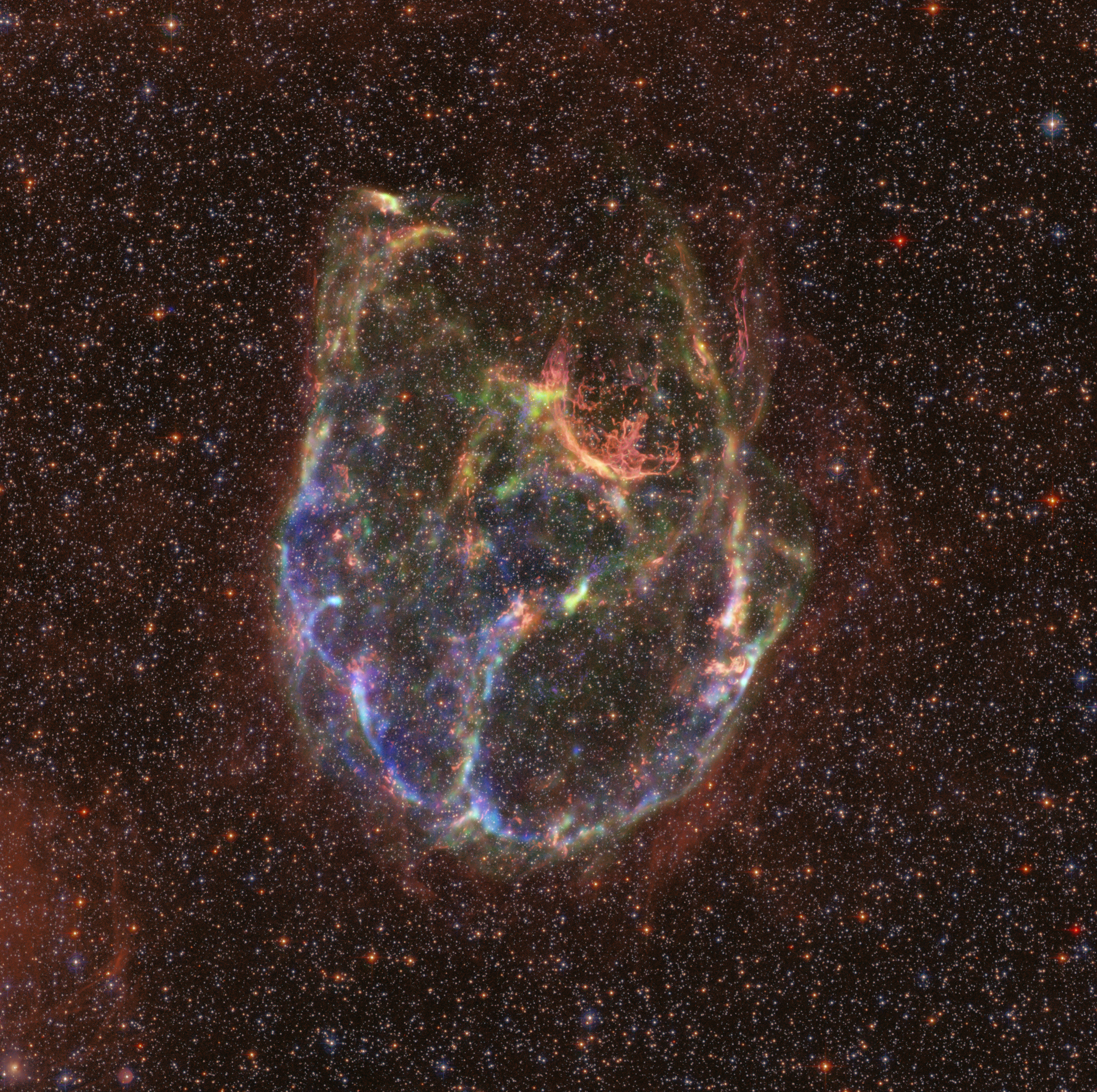

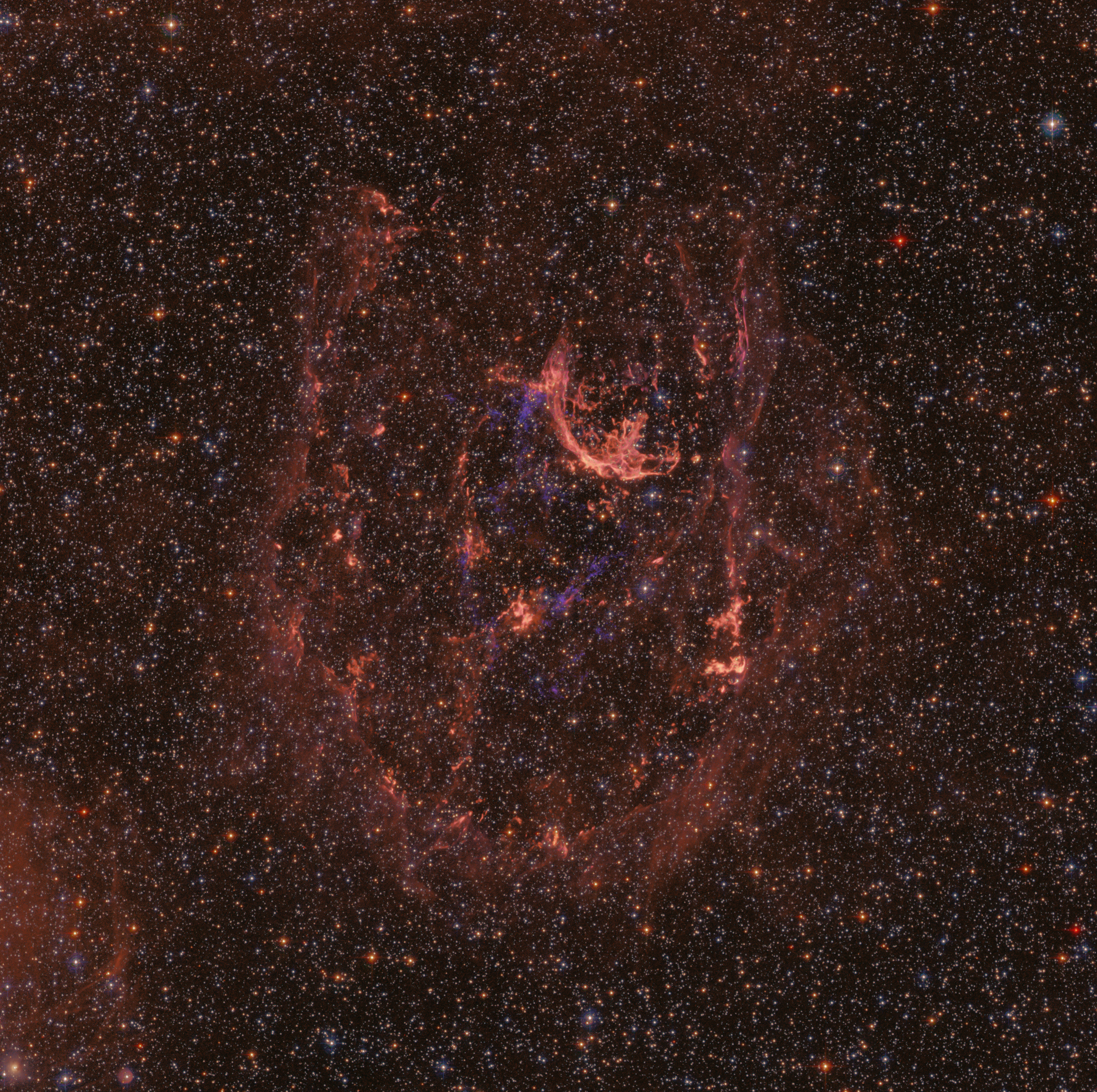

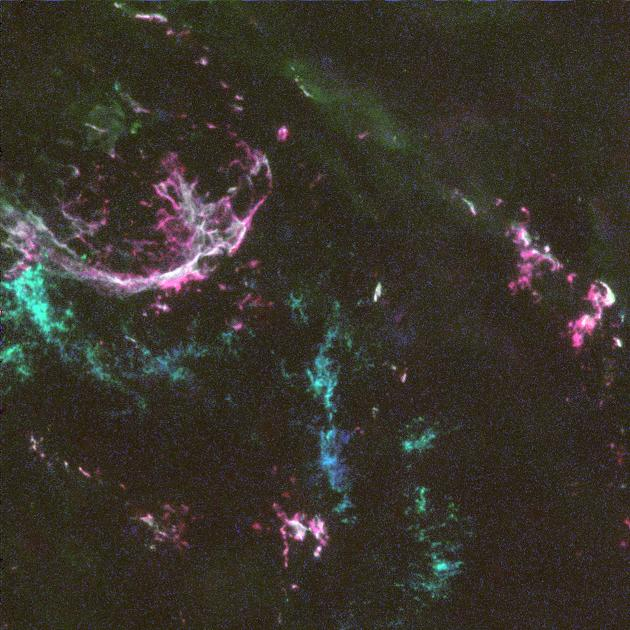

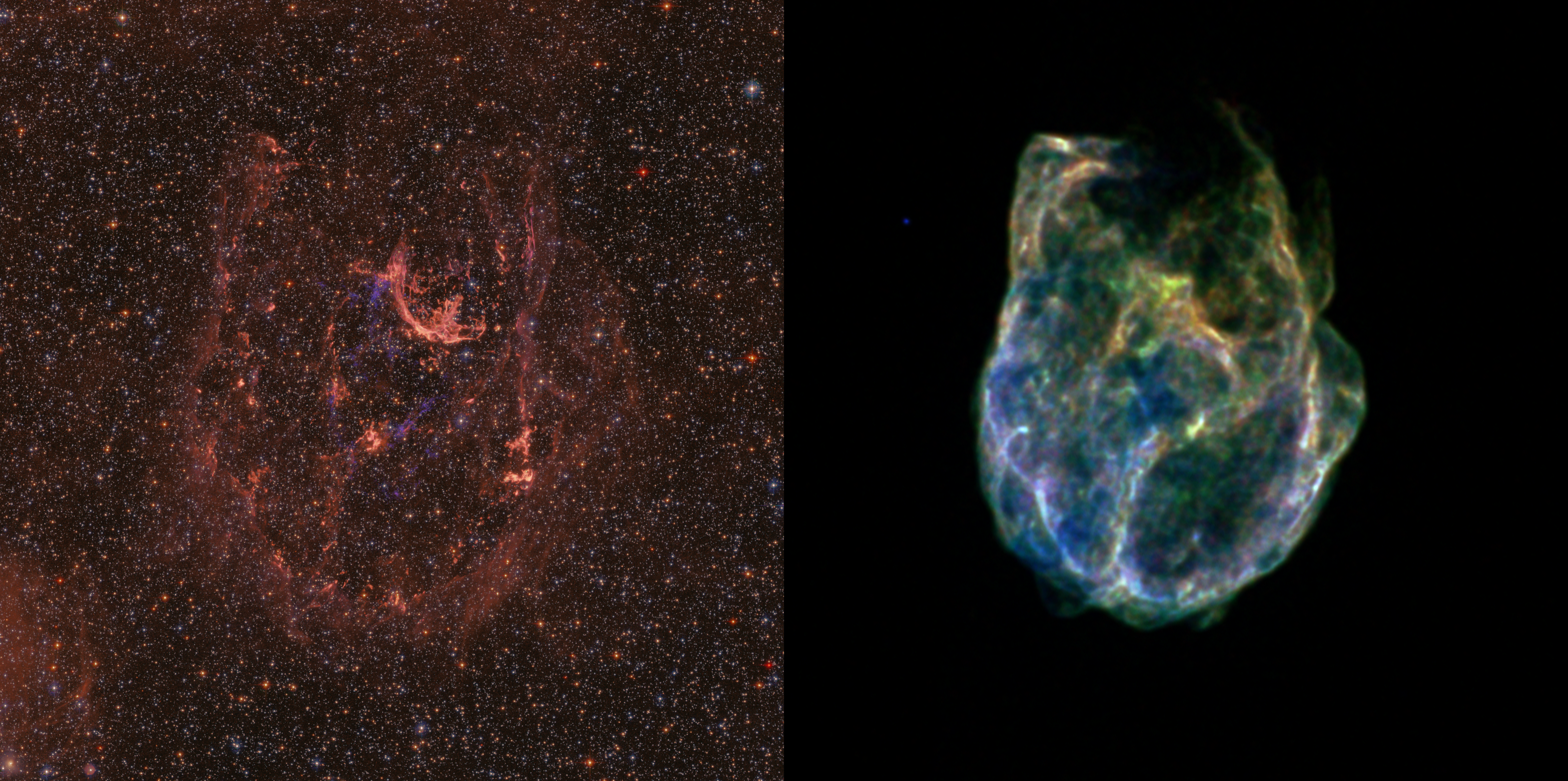

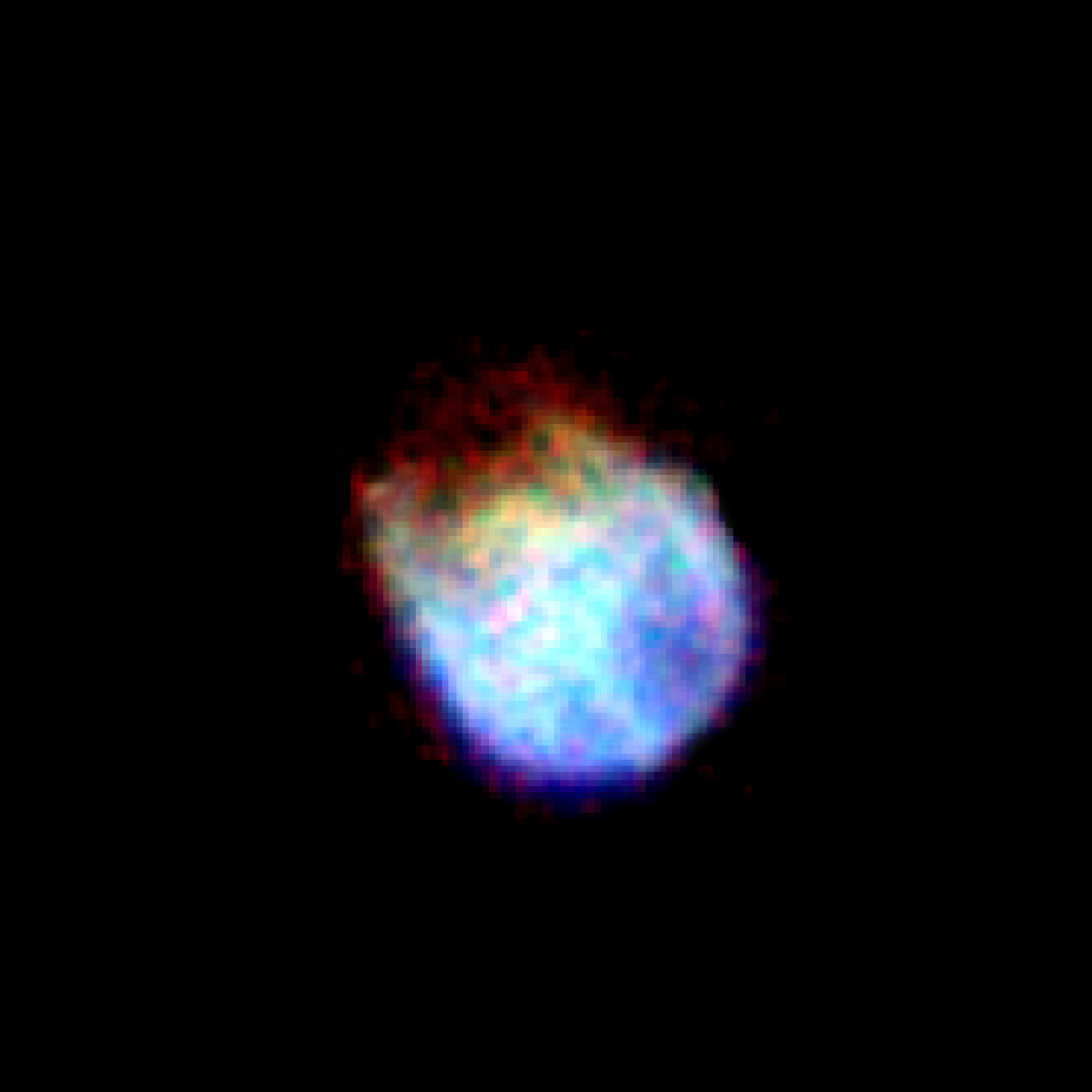

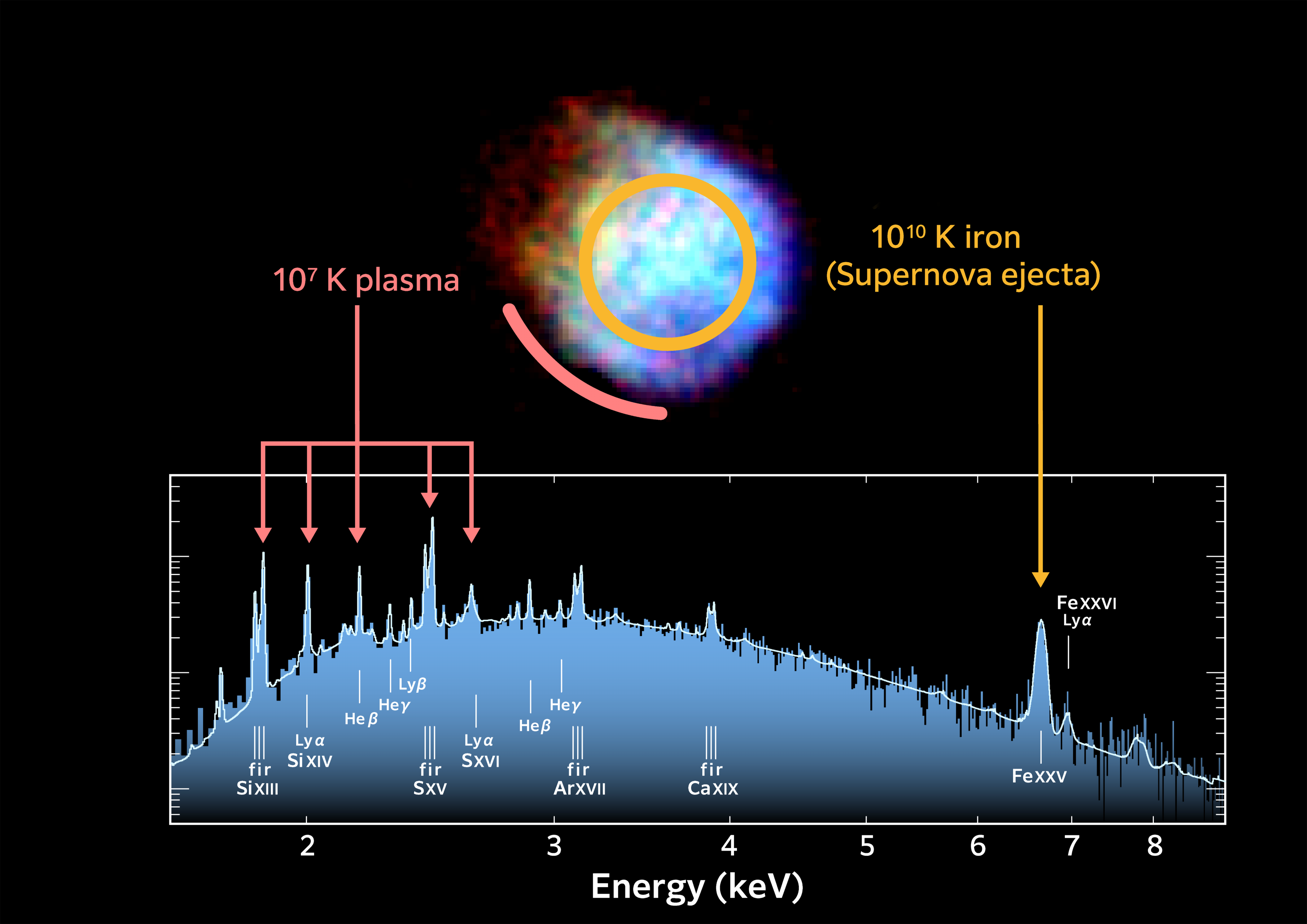

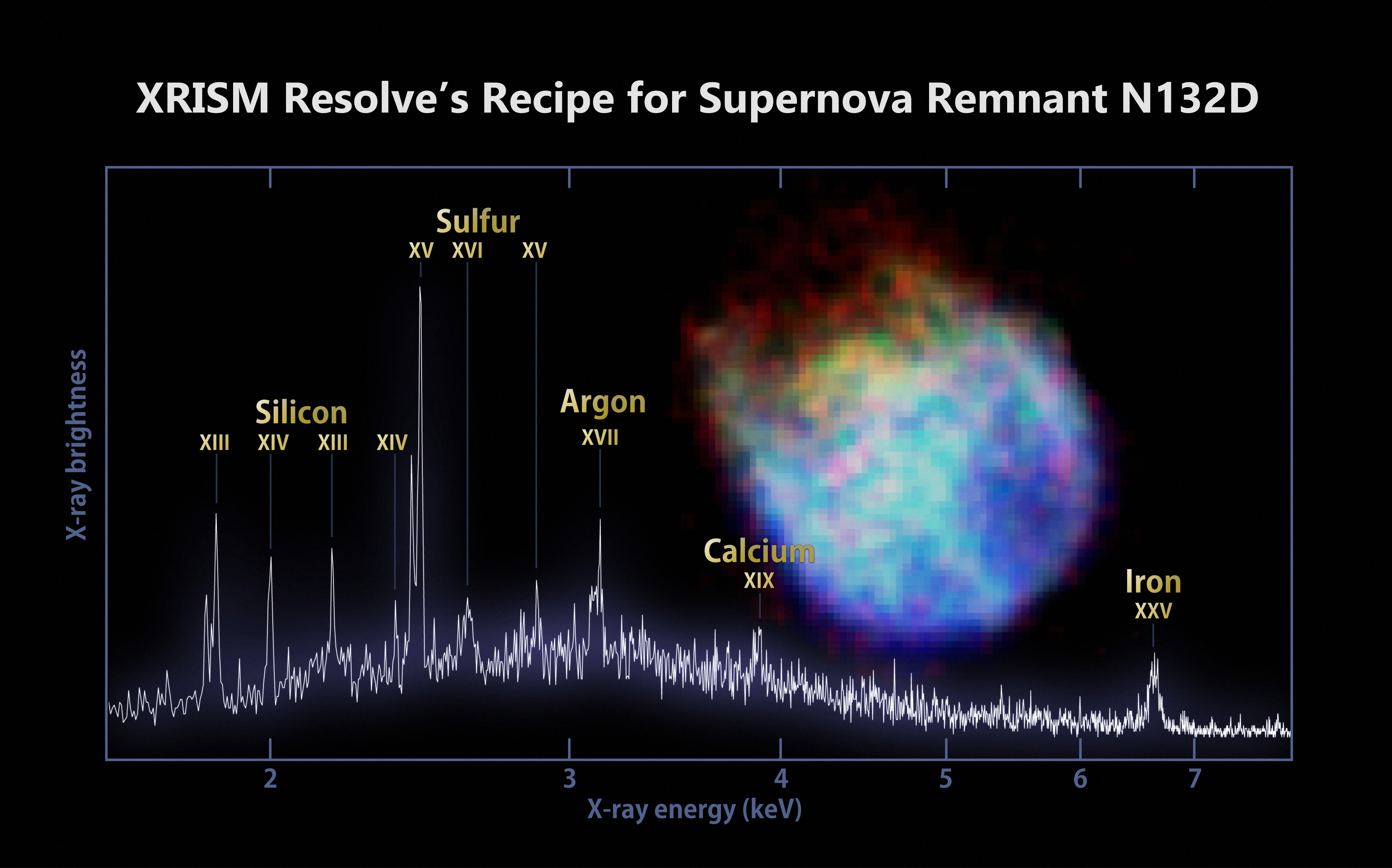

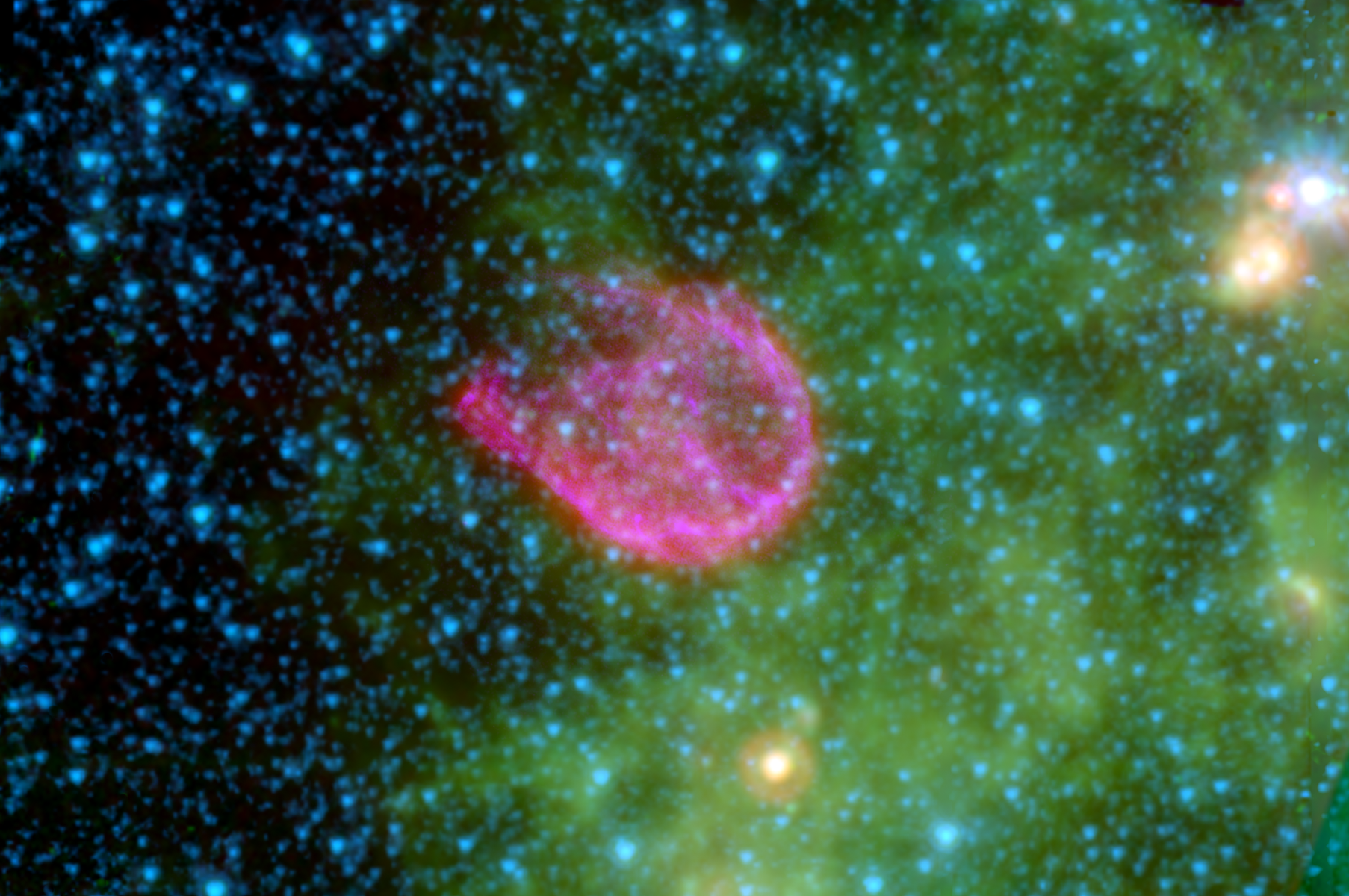

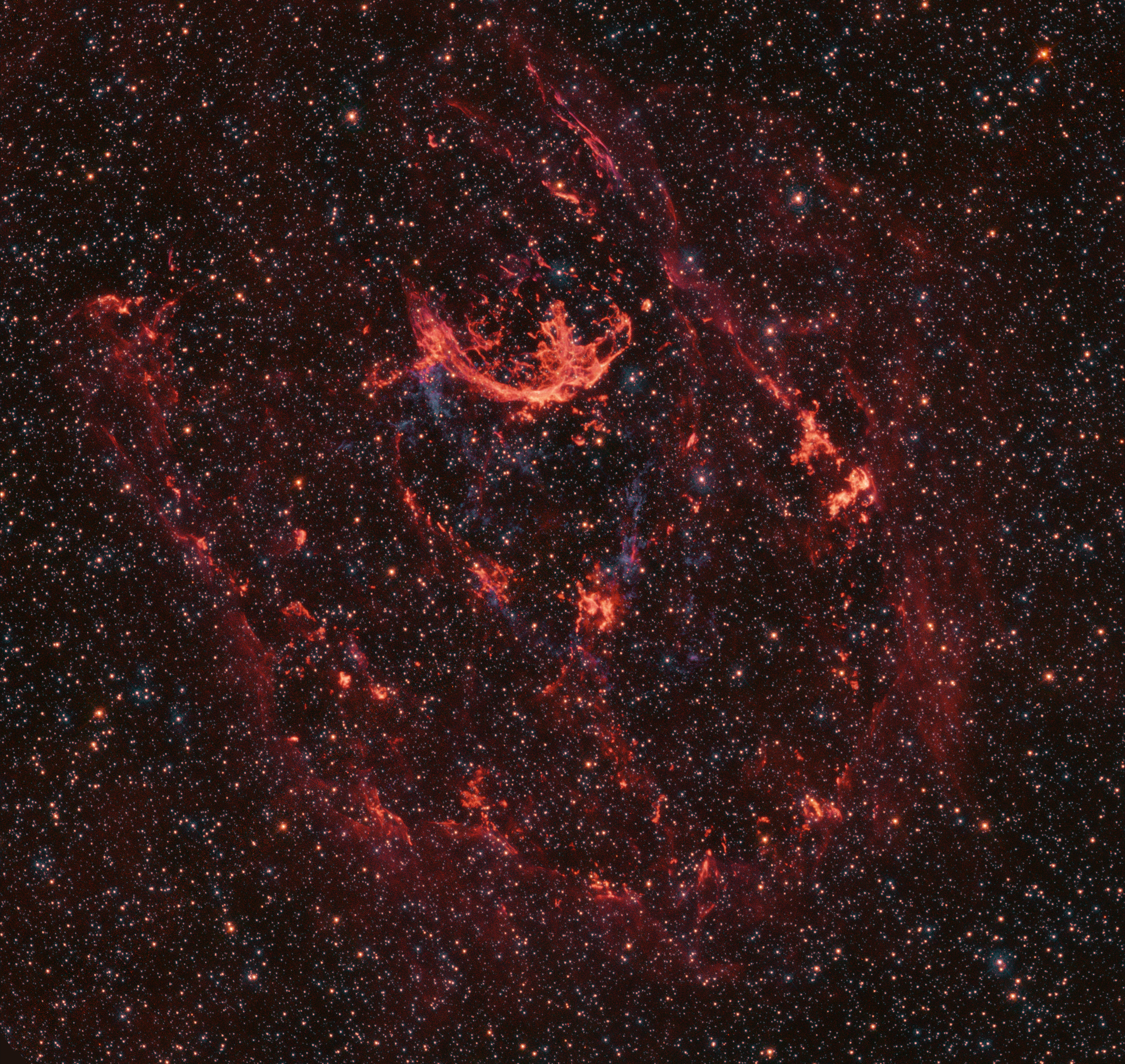

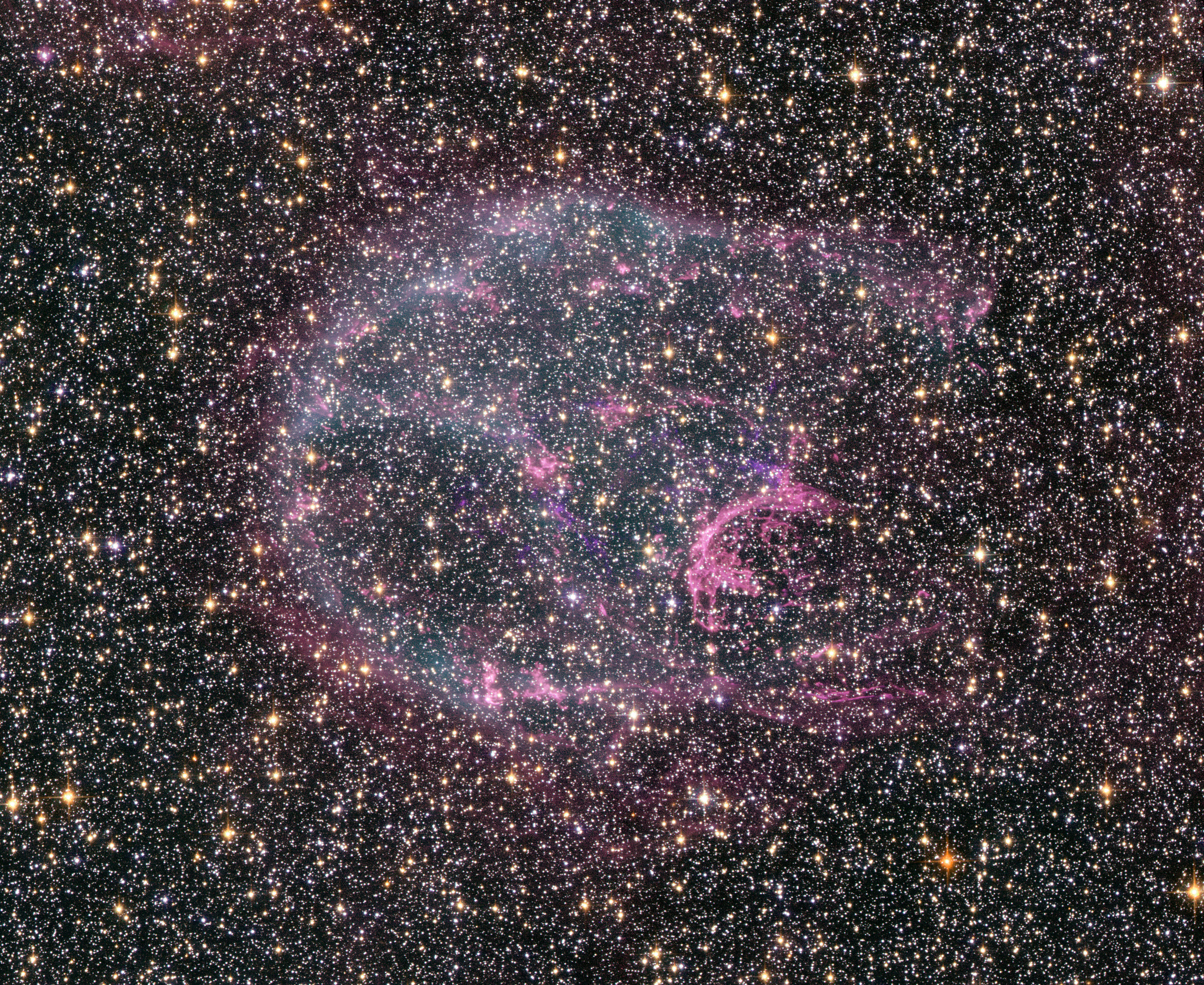
