= E0102-72.3 =

Supernova remnant in the constellation Tucana in the Small Magellanic Cloud

E0102-72.3 SN010102
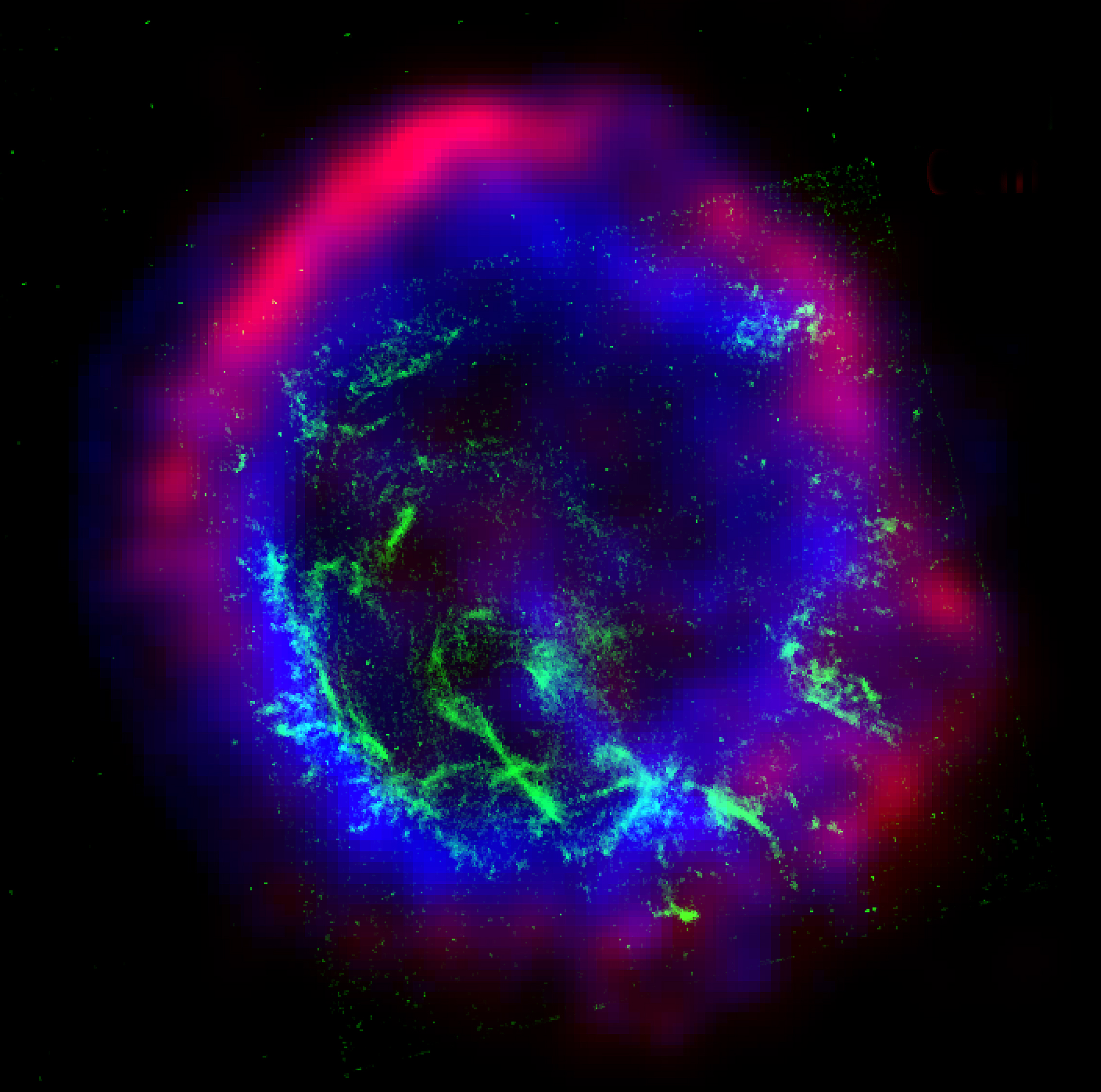
- Remnants of supernova E0102-72.3. Observational data (J2000
- Event type: Supernova remnant
- Constellation: Tucana
- Right ascension: 01^{h} 04^{m} 1.50^{s}
- Declination: -72° 01' 55.7"
- Epoch: J2000.0
- Distance: 190,000 ly
- Other designations: 1ES 0102-72.2, RBS 146, 1RXS J010403.5-720158, [KPF99] 183, [KPF99] 182, [HFP2000] 107, [FJW97] SMC B0102-7218, RX J0104.0-7201, PKS 0102-723, [FBR2002] J010402-720149, MC4 0102-72.3, RX J0103.9-7202, SUMSS J010401-720153
- Related media on Commons

Journey Through E0102-72.3

E0102-72.3 (SNR B0102-72.3), short for 1E 0102.2-7219, is the remnant of a supernova that exploded in the Small Magellanic Cloud, a neighbouring galaxy of the Milky Way. The supernova was caused when a star much more massive than the Sun collapsed under its own gravity. The explosion would have been visible from the Southern Hemisphere of the Earth over 1000 years ago.

The appearance of E0102 is best explained by a model in which the ejecta is shaped like a cylinder that is being viewed almost exactly end-on. This model suggests that the explosion that created the E0102 remnant may itself have been strongly asymmetric, consistent with the rapid kicks given to neutron stars after supernova explosions. Another possibility is that the star exploded into a disk of material formed when material was shed from the equator of the pre-supernova red giant star. Such asymmetries have been observed in winds from lower mass red giants that form planetary nebulae.

The remnant consists of an outer blast wave produced by the supernova, and an inner ring of cooler material. This inner ring is probably expanding ejecta from the explosion that is being heated by a shock wave travelling backwards into the ejecta. At its center is an isolated neutron star, the first such neutron star discovered outside the Milky Way.

== Gallery ==
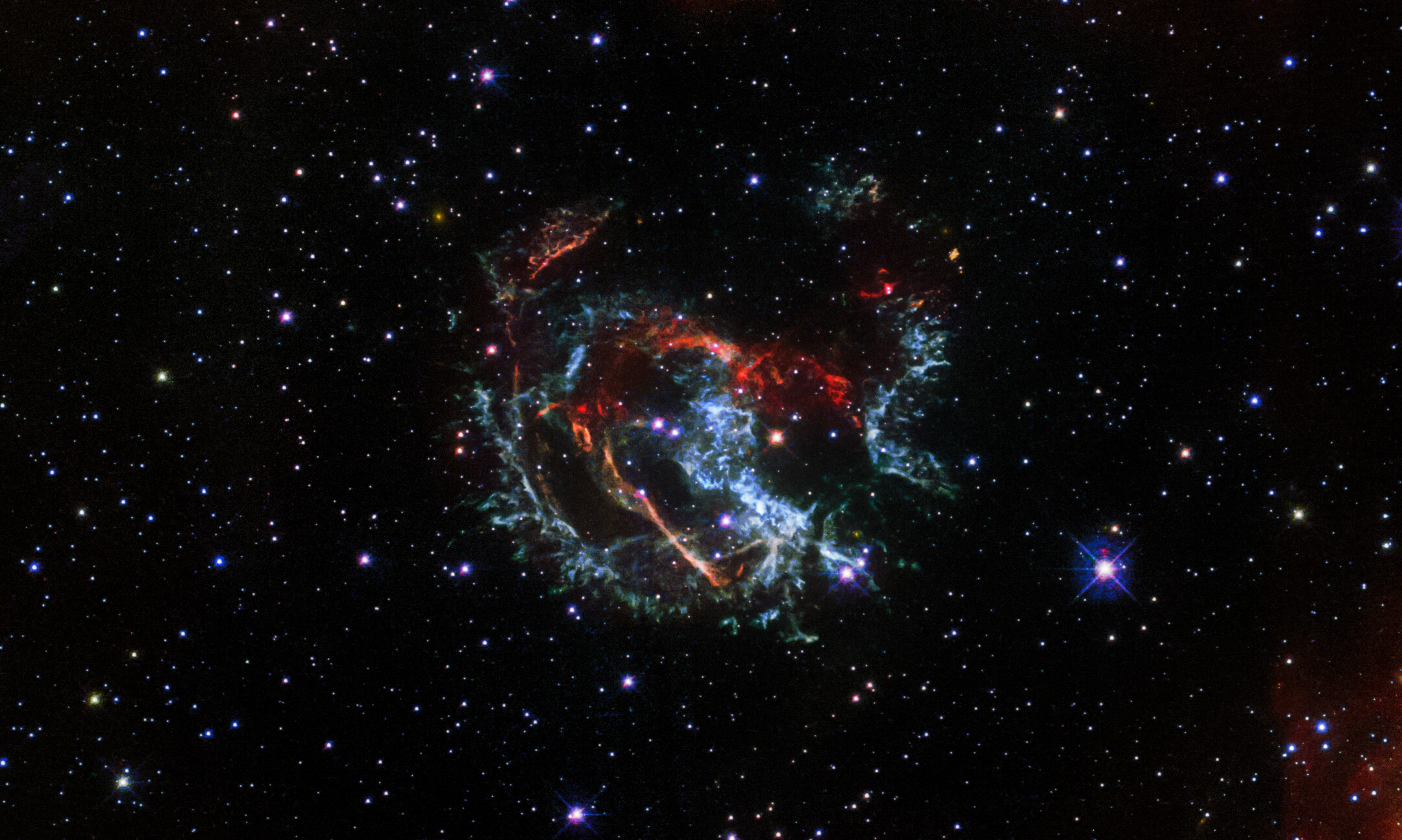
Featured in this Hubble image is an expanding, gaseous corpse — a supernova remnant — known as 1E 0102.2-7219.
