= G305.4–2.2 =

Supernova remnant

Nebula

Observation data
- Class: Supernova remnant
- Distance: 2.2 k pc

Physical characteristics
- Radius: 3.3 pc
- Notable features: Nearly perfectly round shape
- Designations: Teleios

G305.4–2.2 is a supernova remnant located at a distance of 2.3 kpc with a rare circular symmetry in shape, nicknamed Teleios (Greek: τέλειος "perfect"). It has a radius of 3.3 parsecs. It is one of the most circular known supernova remnants. The age of G305.4-2.2 is not known with much precision with it either being young and under 1000 years old or an older remnant being over 10,000 years old.

It was identified in the radio-continuum images of the Australian Square Kilometre Array Pathfinder (ASKAP) Evolutionary Map of the Universe by a group of astronomers led by Miroslav D. Filipović of Western Sydney University.

== See also ==
- List of supernovae
- Supernova
- Lists of astronomical objects
- List of supernova remnants
