= SNR 0519−69.0 =

Supernova remnant

Supernova remnant
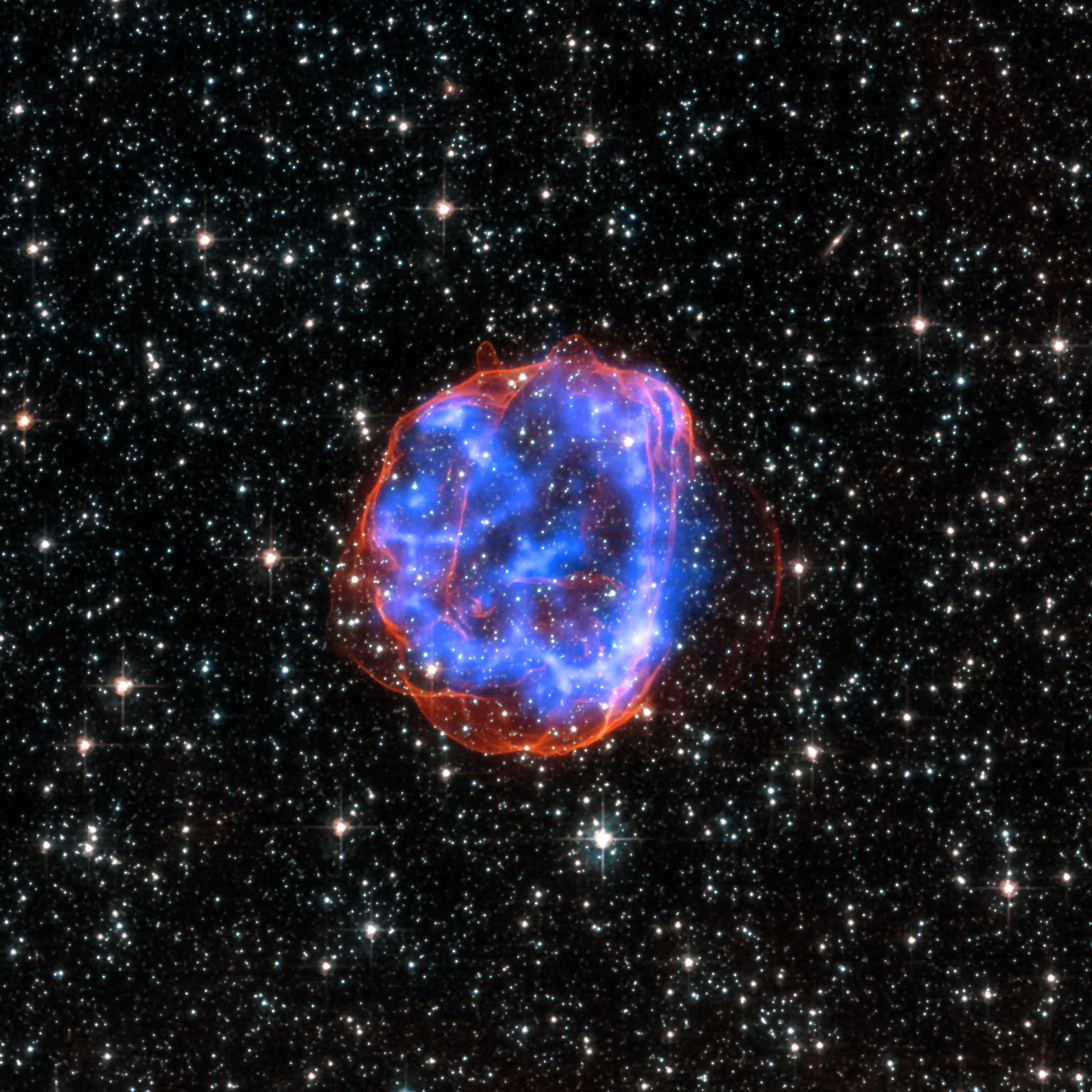
- SNR 0519−69.0 in X-ray (blue) and visible light (red)

Observation data: J2000 epoch
- Class: Supernova remnant
- Right ascension: 05^{h} 19^{m} 35.14^{s}
- Declination: −69^{h} 02^{m} 00.5^{s}
- Distance: 163,000 ly (49,970 pc)
- Constellation: Dorado

Physical characteristics
- Radius: ~4 pc
- Notable features: Ring-like morphology
- Designations: SNR B0519−69.0, LHG 26, MC SNR J0519−6902

SNR 0519−69.0 (abbreviated SNR 0519; also known as LHG 26 or MC SNR J0519−6902) is a supernova remnant (SNR) in the Large Magellanic Cloud. The supernova occurred around 163,000 light-years away in the constellation Dorado approximately 670 years ago. The progenitor of this supernova was likely a star system composed of two white dwarfs, with a mass of 1.2 to 4.0 solar masses. While its initial explosion has ended, it may possess some wind bubble activity. Since then, the nebula has been heavily researched and photographed by astronomers.

It has a diameter of 8 parsecs and exhibits a ring like morphology in radio waves. There are three bright spot regions located to the north, east and south of the supernova remnant. There is a HI cloud that may be associated with the remnant located in the southeastern part.

== Observations ==
SNR 0519 was first discovered in 1981 by astronomers Knox S. Long, David J. Helfand, and David A. Grabelsky during a soft X-ray study of the Large Magellanic Cloud. The SNR nature was verified in 1982, and a supernova type of Ia was additionally proposed. In X-ray observations, SNR 0519 was discovered to be oxygen-poor and iron-rich, cementing it as a type Ia supernova.

SNR 0519's progenitor is a topic of debate in astronomy, though many accept the theory of it being a star system composed of two white dwarfs. However, although many searches have occurred, astronomers have been unable to identify a surviving companion of SNR 0519 (though a candidate was discovered in 2019). A supersoft X-ray source has been entirely ruled out thanks to the absence of a relic ionization nebula.
