= Simeis 147 =

Supernova remnant in the Milky Way

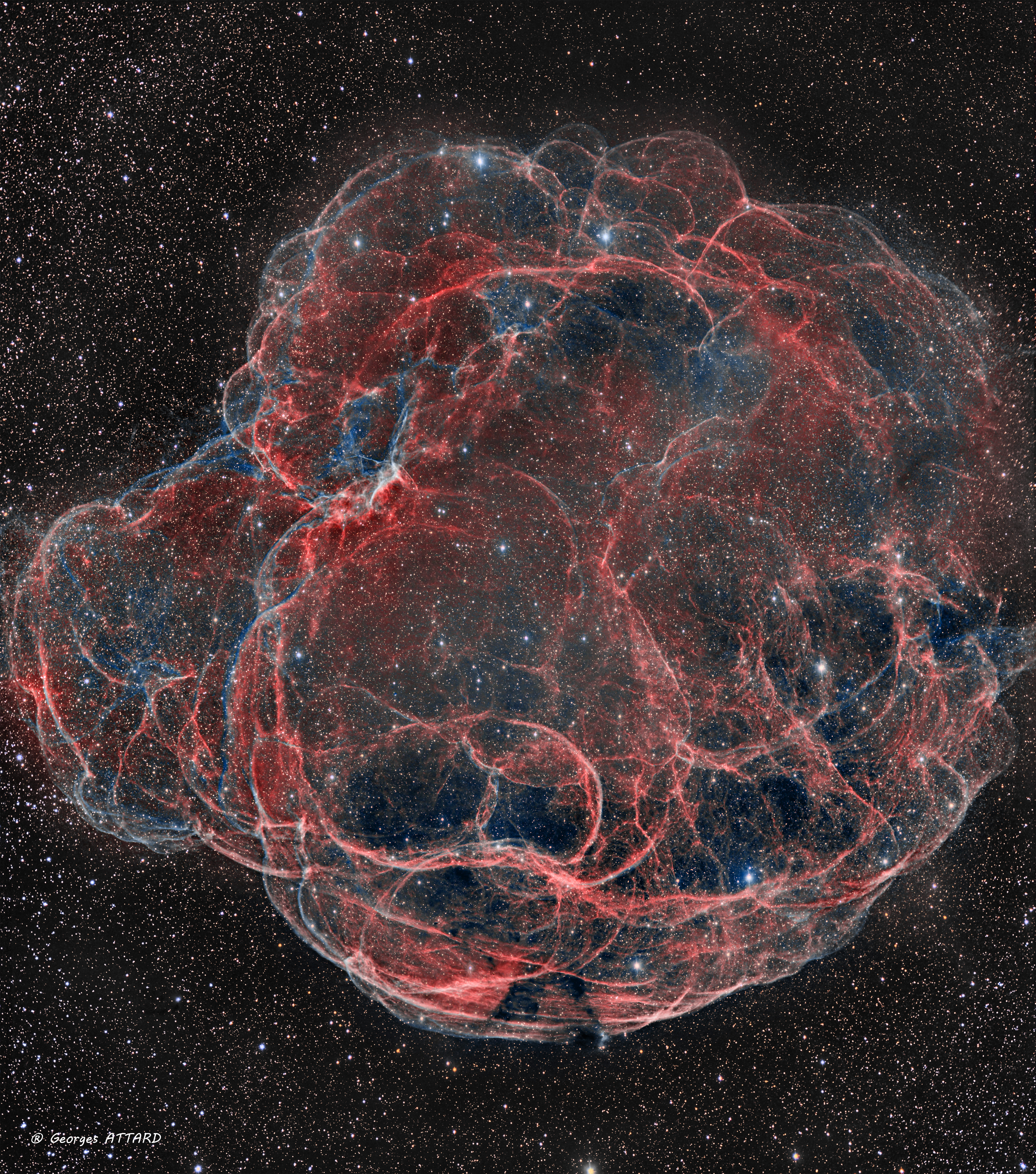
- The supernova remnant nebula from Simeis 147 or the Spaghetti Nebula.
- Event type: Supernova remnant, astronomical radio source, gamma-ray source
- Unknown
- Date: 1952
- Constellation: Taurus
- Right ascension: 05^{h} 39^{m} 06^{s}
- Declination: +27° 59′ 55″
- Epoch: J2000
- Galactic coordinates: Unknown
- Distance: 3,000 light-years (0.92 kpc)
- Remnant: Mixed-morphology
- Host: Milky way
- Progenitor: Unknown
- Progenitor type: Unknown
- Colour (B-V): Unknown
- Peak apparent magnitude: 6.5
- Other designations: 3FHL J0537.6+2751e, 2FGL J0538.1+2718, 3FGL J0540.3+2756e, 2FHL J0534.1+2753
- Related media on Commons

Simeis 147, also known as the Spaghetti Nebula, SNR G180.0-01.7 or Sharpless 2-240, is a supernova remnant (SNR) in the Milky Way, straddling the border between the constellations Auriga and Taurus. It was discovered in 1952 at the Crimean Astrophysical Observatory by Grigory Shajn and his team using a Schmidt camera and a narrowband filter close to the Hydrogen Alpha transmission line. It is difficult to observe due to its extremely low surface brightness. This discovery was part of a survey conducted between 1945 and 1955, most likely using captured German equipment, as the observatory was practically destroyed during WWII. The Schmidt camera had a field of view of 175'. Many previously unknown hydrogen nebula were discovered this way, as they are not readily visible in regular photographs.

The nebulous area has an almost spherical shell and a filamentary structure. The remnant has an apparent diameter of approximately 3 degrees, an estimated distance of approximately 3000±350 light-years, and an age of approximately 40,000 years. At that distance, it spans roughly 160 lightyears.

It is believed that the stellar explosion left behind a rapidly spinning neutron star known as pulsar PSR J0538+2817 in the nebula core, emitting a strong radio signal.

== See also ==
- Little Veil Nebula
- Veil Nebula
