= SNR 0509−67.5 =

Supernova remnant in the constellation Dorado

Diffuse nebula
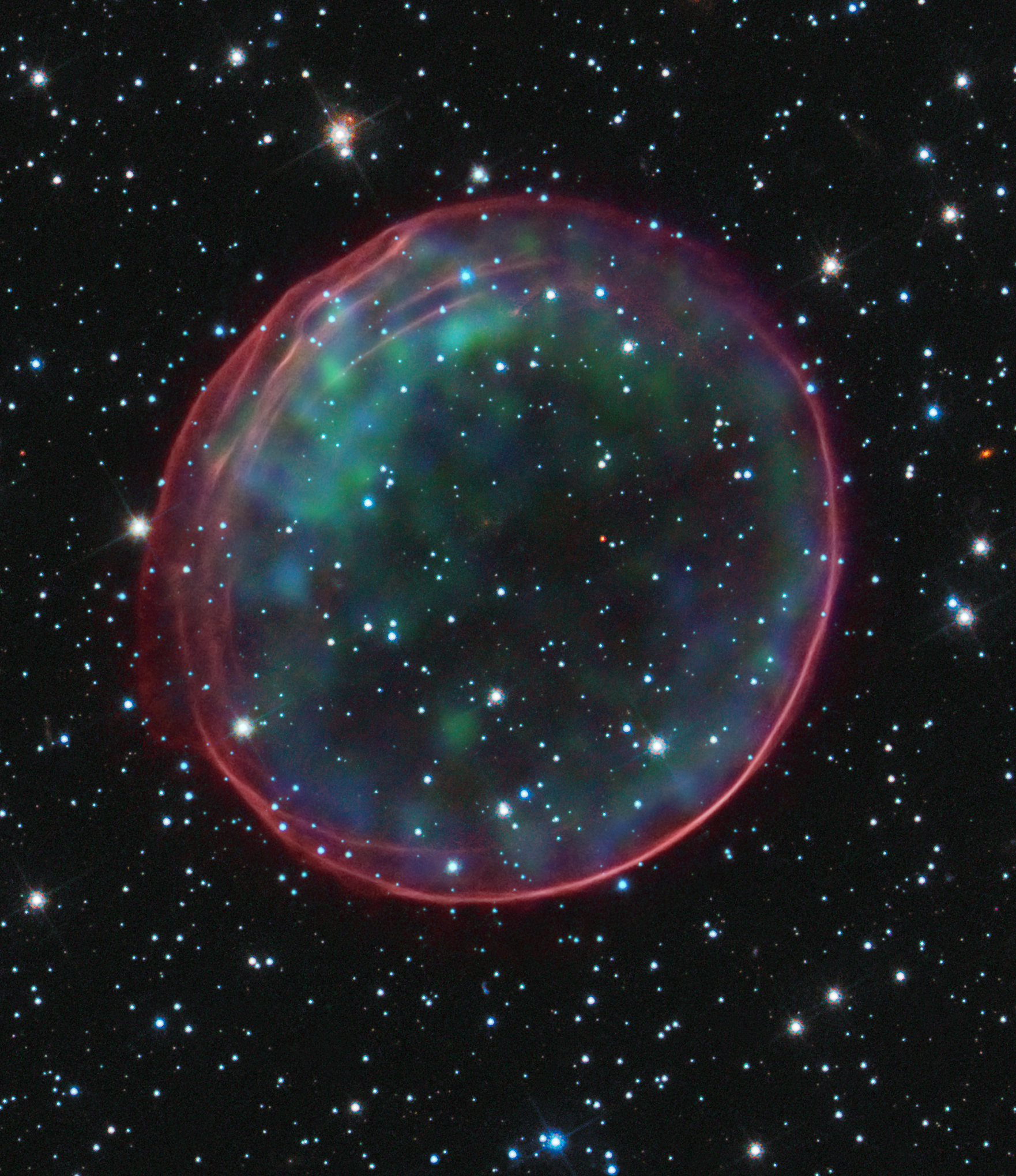
- Shock wave in Optical and X-ray image of Supernova SNR B0509−67.5 - optical in red and X-ray in green.

Observation data: J2000 epoch
- Subtype: supernova remnant
- Right ascension: 05^{h} 09^{m} 31.0^{s}
- Declination: −67° 31′ 18″
- Distance: 160,000 ly
- Constellation: Dorado

SNR 0509−67.5 is a remnant from a supernova in the Large Magellanic Cloud (LMC), that is 160,000 light years away in the constellation of Dorado. It displays a clear shock wave shock shell pattern.

It was probably a Type Ia supernova, as indicated by the detection in 2004 of the elements silicon and iron. Any surviving stars should not have moved far from the site of the explosion. Researchers at the Space Telescope Science Institute in Baltimore, Md. have identified light from the supernova that was reflected off interstellar dust, delaying its arrival at Earth by 400 years, allowing scientists to study the initial blast. This delay, called a light echo, allowed the astronomers to measure the spectral signature of the light from the explosion. By virtue of the color signature, astronomers were able to deduce it was a Type Ia supernova. Scientists have also observed the supernova remnant at X-ray and visible wavelengths, and studied a light echo that helps assess the energy involved in this unusually energetic supernova.

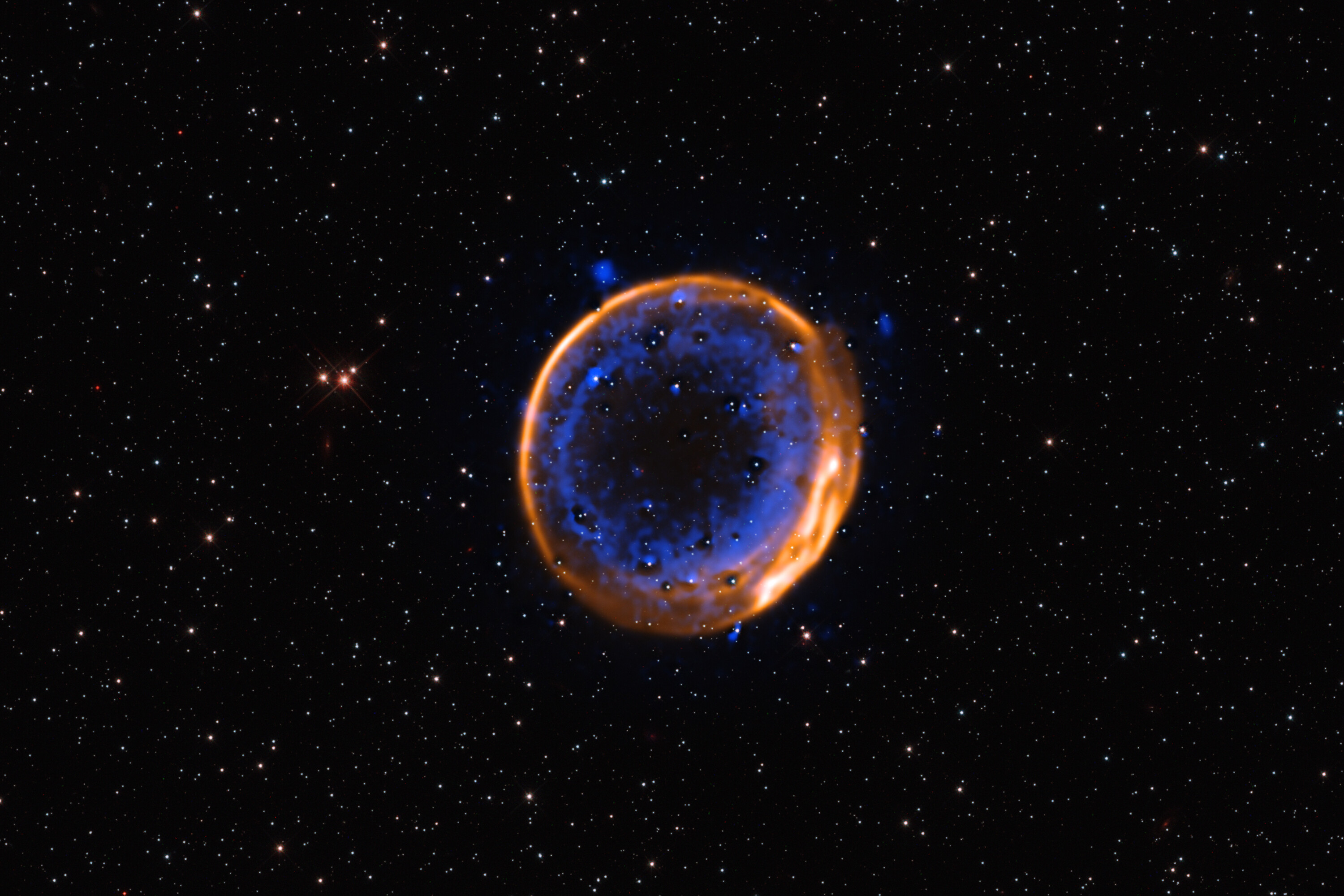
SNR 0509−67.5 imaged by the Very Large Telescope

A paper published in Nature Astronomy on 2 July 2025 states that, for the first time, astronomers have obtained visual evidence that a white dwarf exploded twice, the first time before it reached the Chandrasekhar mass limit. Observations were made of SNR 0509−67.5 with the European Southern Observatory's Very Large Telescope and establish that at least some Type Ia supernovae explode through a "double-detonation" mechanism. In this model a white dwarf forms a blanket of helium around itself taken from a companion star. The helium subsequently becomes unstable and ignites, generating a shockwave that travels around the white dwarf and inwards. This triggers a second detonation in the core of the star, ultimately creating the supernova.
