= DEM L71 =

Supernova remnant in the constellation Dorado

Nebula
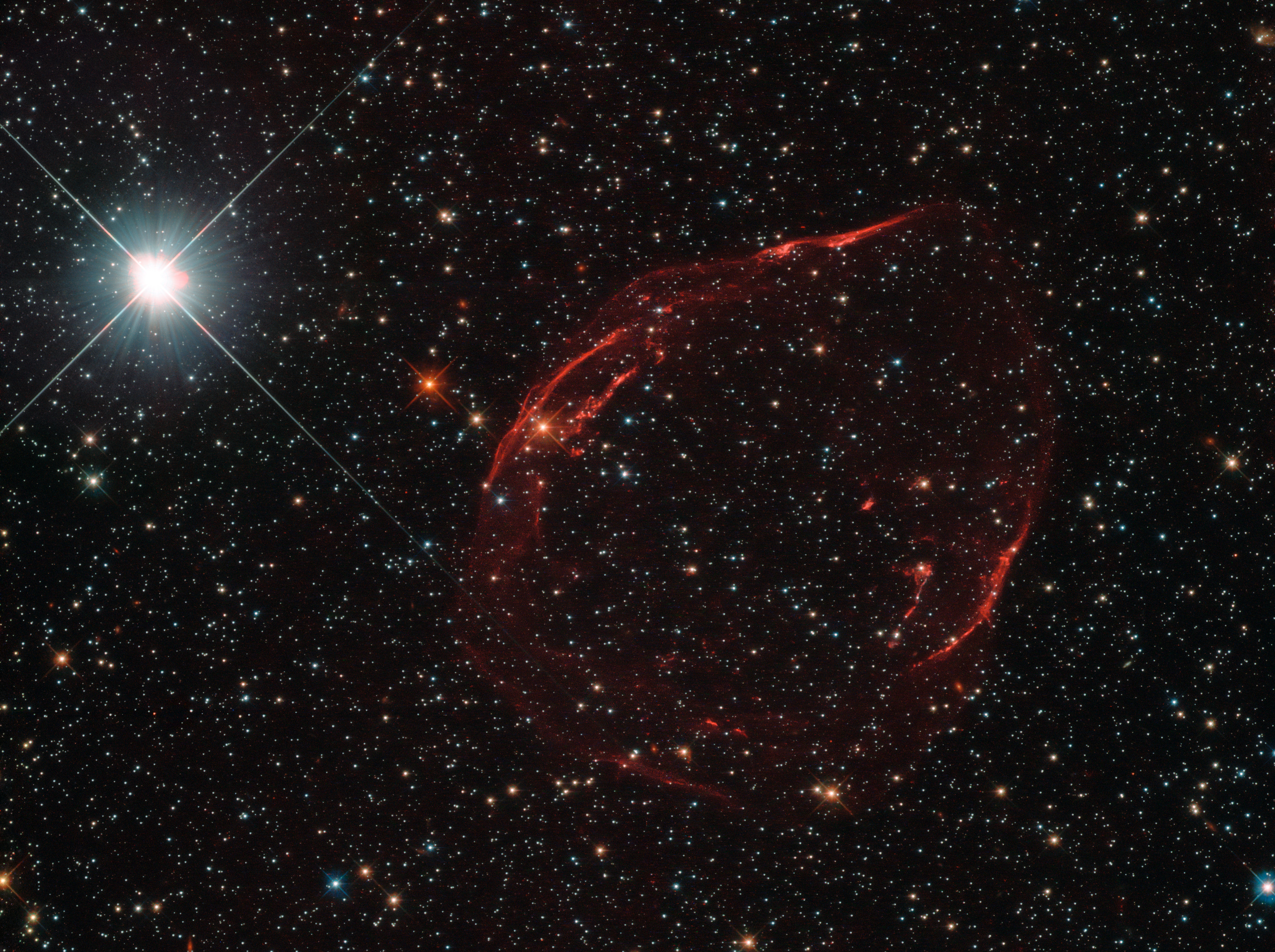
- Image of DEM L71 taken by NASA’s Hubble Space Telescope (HST)

Observation data: J2000 epoch
- Right ascension: 05h 05m 41.70s
- Declination: -67° 52’ 38.00"
- Distance: ~160,000 ly
- Constellation: Dorado
- Notable features: Asymmetric, metal rich

DEM L71 is a supernova remnant located in the constellation of Dorado around 160,000 light years from Earth in the Large Magellanic Cloud (LMC). The supernova occurred around 6660±770 years ago and had the explosive energy of 1.74x10^51 ergs.

The remnant has a length of 10 parsecs and is asymmetrical with many subregions and different composition in different areas. The ejecta is rich in metals such as iron, which is 15 times more abundant than the solar ratio and more abundant towards the center. In the southwestern parts of the nebula magnesium is abundant. Overall, there seems to be a lack of oxygen.
