= Honeycomb Nebula =

Supernova remnant in Dorado

Nebula
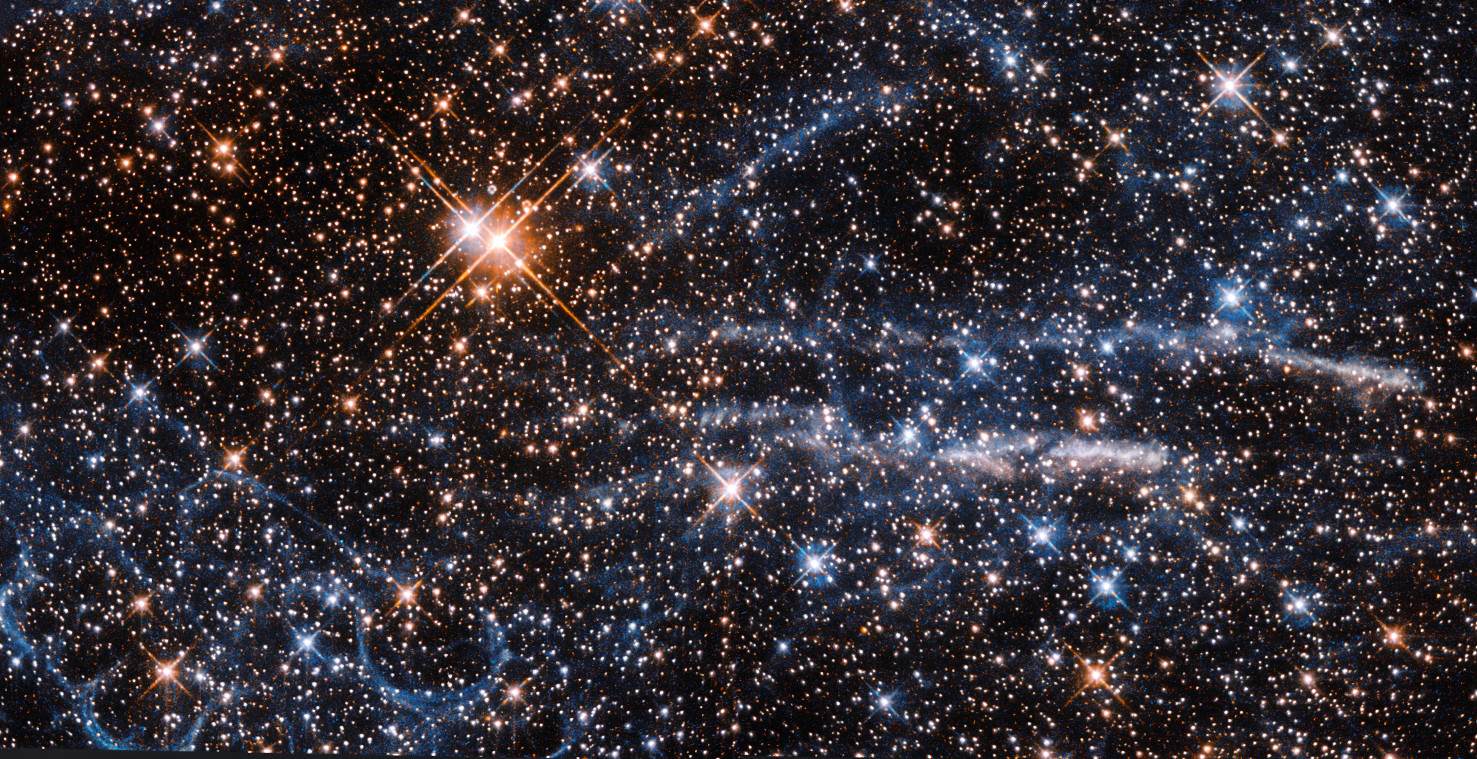
- Hubble image of Honeycomb Nebula.

Observation data: J2000 epoch
- Right ascension: 05^{h} 35^{m} 46.0^{s}
- Declination: −69° 18′ 00″
- Distance: 150 000 ly ly
- Constellation: Dorado

Physical characteristics
- Radius: 37.1 ly
- Dimensions: 1.70 x 1.70
- Designations: Honeycomb, [BMD2010] SNR J0535.8-6918, MCSNR J0535-6918, SNR B0536-69.3

The Honeycomb Nebula is a supernova remnant located 150,000 light years away in the constellation Dorado. It lies along the edge of a giant filamentary shell, located in the massive H II complex 30 Doradus of the Large Magellanic Cloud.
