= Monogem Ring =

Supernova Remnant in Constellation Gemini

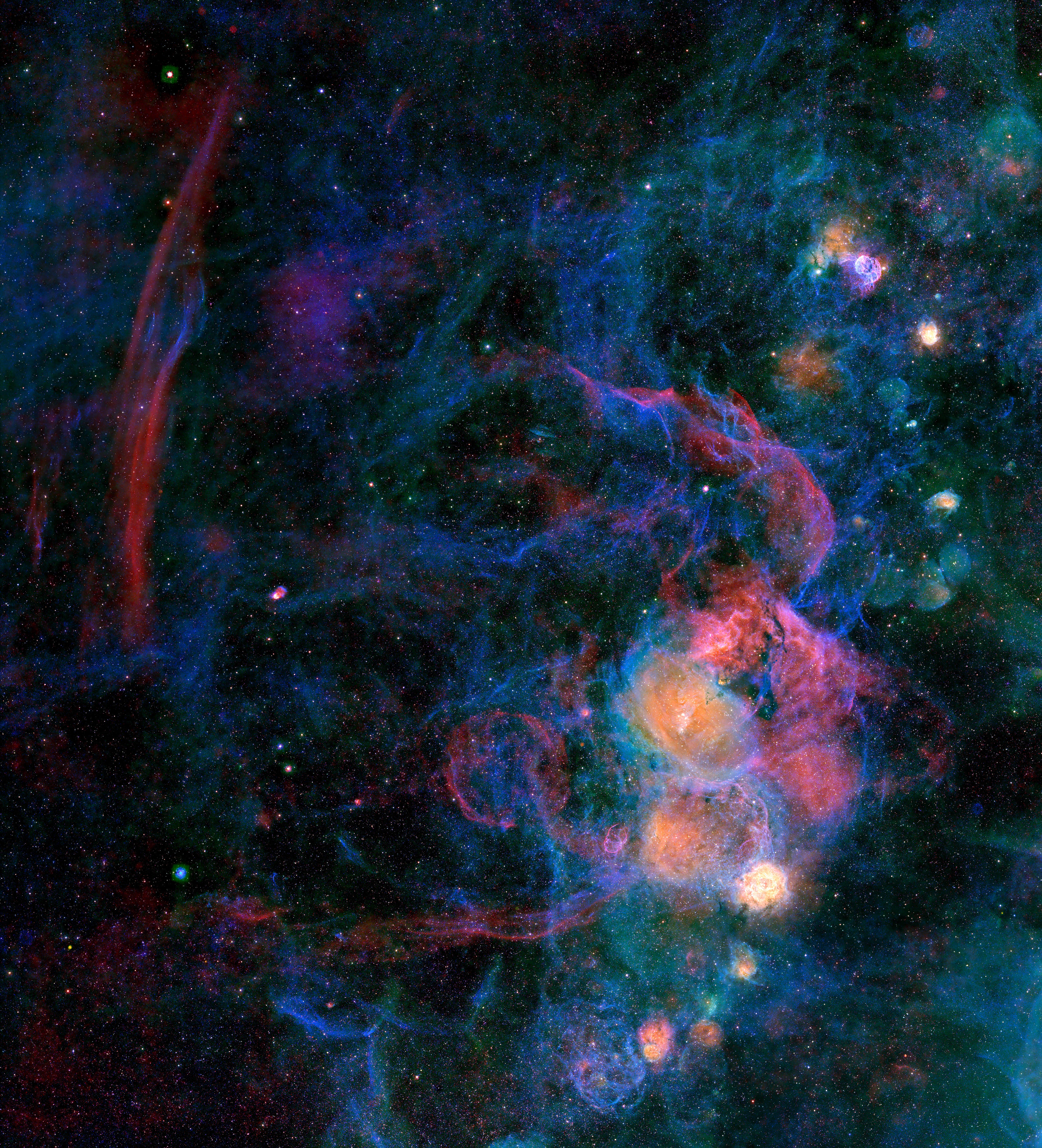
- Filaments of Monogem Ring can be seen in the upper left side of the image
- Event type: Supernova remnant
- II
- Date: 1970s
- Constellation: Gemini
- Right ascension: 06^{h} 58^{m} 50.00^{s}
- Declination: +13° 55′ 54.0″
- Epoch: J2000
- Galactic coordinates: Milky Way Galaxy
- Distance: 300 pc (980 ly)
- Other designations: Monogem Ring, SNR G201.1+08.3
- Related media on Commons

Monogem Ring, (also called SNR G201.1+08.3), is a supernova remnant located in the constellation of Gemini. It was discovered in the early 1970s by its soft X-ray emission.

== Morphology ==
In X-rays, Monogem Ring appears as a bright, smooth object in the study conducted by the ROSAT satellite. It is thought to be a large, evolved supernova remnant in the adiabatic phase of its evolution, expanding in a very low-density interstellar medium. Its far-ultraviolet emission was detected in 2007, where the C IV line and others indicate details of the interaction of this supernova remnant with the interstellar medium. However, Monogem Ring does not show radio emission in the meter or decimeter range, as would be expected in old supernova remnants, where synchrotron emission is the dominant process. This has been attributed to the unusually low density of the surrounding medium.

== Stellar remnant ==
The radio pulsar PSR B0656+14 was discovered in 1989 within Monogem Ring as viewed from Earth slightly displaced from the geometric center of the supernova remnant. Subsequent observations showed that the pulsar had a proper motion towards the center of the remnant, contrary to what would be expected if the pulsar and the supernova remnant were linked, making the association between the two objects seem quite improbable. However, the distance to the pulsar, measured by parallax, is similar to that of its characteristic age of 110,000 years. Furthermore, it has been suggested that interaction with the interstellar medium has distorted the morphology of this supernova remnant, making it difficult to determine its true center. Therefore, it is thought that PSR B0656+14 may indeed be the stellar remnant of the supernova that gave rise to Monogem Ring. TeV haloes are detected around PSR B0656+14 by High-Altitude Water Cherenkov Telescope.

== Distance and age ==
Monogem Ring is located at a distance of approximately 970 light-years (300 parsecs). If it is indeed associated with PSR B0656+14, its distance can be determined with greater precision of 288+33
−27 parsecs. Since the pulsar's parallax has been determined by interferometric measurements. Furthermore, the age of this supernova remnant is not known with certainty. According to different models, its age could be 68000+800
−900 years, an estimated value based on spectral analysis results for a distance of 300 parsecs is around 86,000 years to 100,000 years.
