= Triple conjunction =

Recurring visual proximity of planets and stars

A triple conjunction is an astronomical event when two planets or a planet and a star appear to meet each other three times during a brief period, either in opposition or at the time of inferior conjunction, if an inferior planet is involved. The visible movement of the planet or the planets in the sky appears therefore normally prograde at the first conjunction, retrograde at the second conjunction, and again prograde at the third conjunction.

The lining-up of three planets is a particular case of syzygy.

There are three possible cases of triple conjunctions.

== Between Mercury and Venus ==
At nearly every superior conjunction of Venus (when Venus passes behind the Sun) there is a triple conjunction between Mercury and Venus. In most cases the second conjunction is not visible, because both planets have too small elongation from the Sun.

Triple conjunctions between Mercury and Venus are also possible when they are passing between Earth and the Sun at the same time. This event is much rarer, and also in this case the second conjunction is usually not observable.

== Of inferior planets with superior planets or stars ==
If Mars is in conjunction with the Sun, there is often a triple conjunction between Mars and Mercury or between Mars and Venus. In the events in which Mercury is involved, the second conjunction is invisible because of small elongation from Sun; both other events are difficult to see because of the nearness to horizon and the relatively low brightness of Mars, which is there always near its greatest distance from Earth, barely visible.

For a Mars–Venus triple conjunction all three events can almost always be seen, but Mars is dim because of its great distance from the Earth.

Triple conjunctions between the inferior planets Mercury and Venus and the superior planets Jupiter, Saturn, Uranus, Neptune, dwarf planet Pluto or with stars take place when these objects are at the same time in conjunction to Sun while Mercury or Venus are at inferior conjunction. Frequently the second conjunction takes place when both bodies are too close to the Sun in order to be seen, while the other conjunctions are easily visible, especially if the other body is Jupiter, Saturn or a bright star.

With the dim planets Uranus, Neptune and dwarf planet Pluto the visibility of such an event is difficult, because of the low elongation from Sun.

Triple conjunctions of Mercury and Venus with the exterior planets Jupiter, Saturn, Uranus, Neptune, and dwarf planet Pluto happen relatively frequently (approximately once in 10 years).

== Between two exterior planets ==
These are the most interesting triple conjunctions, because all three conjunctions can be seen very easily, because of the great elongation of the planets or stars involved.

Triple conjunctions between the bright exterior planets are very rare: the last triple conjunctions between Mars and Jupiter occurred in 1789–1790, in 1836–1837 and in 1979–1980. The next events of this kind will be again in 2123 and in 2169–2170.

The last triple conjunctions between Mars and Saturn took place in 1779, 1877 (only in right ascension) and in 1945–1946. The next triple conjunction between these planets will occur in 2148–2149, in 2185 and in 2187.

For both at triple conjunctions between Mars and Jupiter and for triple conjunctions between Mars and Saturn it is possible that two such events follow at an interval of only 2 years. This last happened for Mars and Jupiter in 927 and 929 and will be again in 2742 and 2744. It last happened for Mars and Saturn in 1742–1743 and 1744–1745 and will occur again in 2185 and 2187.

Conjunctions between Jupiter and Saturn—so-called great conjunctions, and are sometimes triple (seven times between AD 1200 and 2400). The three conjunctions occur several months apart, over a broad range of elongations from the sun. The most historically important triple conjunction was that one between Jupiter and Saturn in 7 BCE-5 BCE, which has been proposed as the explanation for the star of Bethlehem. Triple conjunctions between Jupiter and Saturn last took place in 1682–1683, 1821 (only in right ascension), 1940–1941 and 1981. It will not occur again until 2238–2239.

There are more frequent triple conjunctions of Jupiter with Uranus or Neptune. They are unspectacular, but offer a good possibility for amateur astronomers to find these dim planets. The last triple conjunction between Jupiter and Uranus was in 2010–2011 and the next will be in 2037–2038. The last between Jupiter and Neptune was in 2009 and the next will be in 2047–2048.

At each opposition, because of the visible loop movement of the planets, there are triple conjunctions between the planet and some stars. Triple conjunctions between planets and bright stars close to the zodiac are not so frequent (approximately 2 events in 10 years).

== Of the planets Mars, Jupiter, Saturn, Uranus, and Neptune in right ascension between 1800 and 2100 ==
| Year | Involved planets | 1st Conjunction | 2nd Conjunction | 3rd Conjunction |
|---|---|---|---|---|
| 1821 | Uranus–Neptune | March 17 | May 7 | December 2 |
| 1821 | Jupiter–Saturn | June 25 | November 23 | December 23 |
| 1836/37 | Mars–Jupiter | November 14, 1836 | March 5, 1837 | March 23, 1837 |
| 1843 | Jupiter–Neptune | April 9 | September 15 | November 5 |
| 1845 | Mars–Neptune | June 18 | September 2 | October 3 |
| 1846 | Saturn–Neptune | March 31 | September 14 | December 3 |
| 1851/52 | Saturn–Uranus | July 15, 1851 | October 4, 1851 | March 4, 1852 |
| 1877 | Mars–Saturn | July 27 | August 26 | November 4 |
| 1888 | Mars–Uranus | January 9 | May 5 | June 7 |
| 1896/97 | Mars–Neptune | September 24, 1896 | December 12, 1896 | February 19, 1897 |
| 1896/97 | Saturn–Uranus | December 28, 1896 | June 19, 1897 | August 26, 1897 |
| 1907 | Mars–Uranus | May 2 | July 19 | August 24 |
| 1919/20 | Jupiter–Neptune | September 23, 1919 | March 13, 1920 | April 20, 1920 |
| 1927/28 | Jupiter–Uranus | July 9, 1927 | August 19, 1927 | January 23, 1928 |
| 1932/33 | Mars–Neptune | December 5, 1932 | March 11, 1933 | May 16, 1933 |
| 1940/41 | Jupiter–Saturn | August 15, 1940 | October 12, 1940 | February 20, 1941 |
| 1943/44 | Mars–Uranus | September 9, 1943 | December 26, 1943 | January 20, 1944 |
| 1945/46 | Mars–Saturn | October 26, 1945 | January 22, 1946 | March 19, 1946 |
| 1952/53 | Saturn–Neptune | November 18, 1952 | May 31, 1953 | July 11, 1953 |
| 1954/55 | Jupiter–Uranus | October 8, 1954 | January 6, 1955 | May 10, 1955 |
| 1964/65 | Mars–Uranus | December 5, 1964 | April 3, 1965 | May 6, 1965 |
| 1968/69 | Jupiter–Uranus | December 9, 1968 | March 15, 1969 | July 18, 1969 |
| 1971 | Jupiter–Neptune | February 2 | May 20 | September 18 |
| 1979/80 | Mars–Jupiter | December 13, 1979 | March 2, 1980 | May 4, 1980 |
| 1981 | Jupiter–Saturn | January 14 | February 19 | July 30 |
| 1983 | Jupiter–Uranus | February 17 | May 16 | September 24 |
| 1988 | Saturn–Uranus | February 13 | June 27 | October 18 |
| 1989 | Saturn–Neptune | March 3 | June 24 | November 12 |
| 1993 | Uranus–Neptune | January 26 | September 17 | September 28 |
| 2009 | Jupiter–Neptune | May 25 | July 13 | December 20 |
| 2010/11 | Jupiter–Uranus | June 6, 2010 | September 22, 2010 | January 2, 2011 |
| 2025/26 | Saturn–Neptune | June 29, 2025 | August 6, 2025 | February 16, 2026 |
| 2037/38 | Jupiter–Uranus | September 8, 2037 | February 19, 2038 | March 30, 2038 |
| 2041/42 | Mars–Uranus | November 2, 2041 | March 16, 2042 | March 18, 2042 |
| 2047/48 | Jupiter–Neptune | July 24, 2047 | November 15, 2047 | February 26, 2048 |
| 2063 | Mars–Uranus | February 23 | May 27 | July 17 |
| 2066 | Jupiter–Uranus | January 19 | June 27 | August 18 |
| 2071/72 | Mars–Neptune | October 8, 2071 | February 5, 2072 | February 29, 2072 |
| 2079 | Saturn–Uranus | February 28 | August 29 | October 23 |
| 2085/86 | Jupiter–Neptune | October 30, 2085 | January 13, 2086 | June 8, 2086 |
| 2088/89 | Mars–Neptune | December 14, 2088 | January 4, 2089 | May 13, 2089 |
| 2093 | Jupiter–Uranus | May 16 | October 27 | November 30 |

== Of the planets Mars, Jupiter, Saturn, Uranus, and Neptune in ecliptic longitude between 1800 and 2100 ==
| Year | Involved planets | 1st Conjunction | 2nd Conjunction | 3rd Conjunction |
|---|---|---|---|---|
| 1821 | Uranus–Neptune | March 22 | May 3 | December 3 |
| 1836/37 | Mars–Jupiter | November 15, 1836 | February 28, 1837 | March 29, 1837 |
| 1843 | Jupiter–Neptune | April 9 | September 12 | November 8 |
| 1845 | Mars–Neptune | June 21 | August 22 | October 8 |
| 1846 | Saturn–Neptune | April 4 | September 5 | December 11 |
| 1888 | Mars–Uranus | January 11 | May 4 | June 5 |
| 1896/97 | Mars–Neptune | September 24, 1896 | December 13, 1896 | February 18, 1897 |
| 1897 | Saturn–Uranus | January 6 | June 1 | September 9 |
| 1907 | Mars–Uranus | May 2 | July 17 | August 26 |
| 1919/20 | Jupiter–Neptune | September 24, 1919 | March 8, 1920 | April 24, 1920 |
| 1927/28 | Jupiter–Uranus | July 15, 1927 | August 11, 1927 | January 25, 1928 |
| 1932/33 | Mars–Neptune | December 6, 1932 | March 7, 1933 | May 17, 1933 |
| 1940/41 | Jupiter–Saturn | August 8, 1940 | October 20, 1940 | February 15, 1941 |
| 1943/44 | Mars–Uranus | September 9, 1943 | December 30, 1943 | January 16, 1944 |
| 1945/46 | Mars–Saturn | October 27, 1945 | January 20, 1946 | March 20, 1946 |
| 1952/53 | Saturn–Neptune | November 21, 1952 | May 17, 1953 | July 22, 1953 |
| 1954/55 | Jupiter–Uranus | October 7, 1954 | January 7, 1955 | May 10, 1955 |
| 1964/65 | Mars–Uranus | December 6, 1964 | March 29, 1965 | May 8, 1965 |
| 1968/69 | Jupiter–Uranus | December 11, 1968 | March 11, 1969 | July 20, 1969 |
| 1971 | Jupiter–Neptune | February 1 | May 22 | September 16 |
| 1979/80 | Mars–Jupiter | December 16, 1979 | February 27, 1980 | May 5, 1980 |
| 1980/81 | Jupiter–Saturn | December 31, 1980 | March 4, 1981 | July 24, 1981 |
| 1983 | Jupiter–Uranus | February 18 | May 14 | September 25 |
| 1988 | Saturn–Uranus | February 13 | June 26 | October 18 |
| 1989 | Saturn–Neptune | March 3 | June 24 | November 13 |
| 1993 | Uranus–Neptune | February 2 | August 19 | October 25 |
| 2009 | Jupiter–Neptune | May 27 | July 10 | December 21 |
| 2010/11 | Jupiter–Uranus | June 8, 2010 | September 19, 2010 | January 4, 2011 |
| 2037/38 | Jupiter–Uranus | September 8, 2037 | February 19, 2038 | March 30, 2038 |
| 2041/42 | Mars–Uranus | November 2, 2041 | March 5, 2042 | March 28, 2042 |
| 2047/48 | Jupiter–Neptune | July 22, 2047 | November 16, 2047 | February 24, 2048 |
| 2063 | Mars–Uranus | February 24 | May 28 | July 15 |
| 2066 | Jupiter–Uranus | January 20 | June 24 | August 21 |
| 2071/72 | Mars–Neptune | October 8, 2071 | February 2, 2072 | March 3, 2072 |
| 2079 | Saturn–Uranus | February 26 | August 31 | October 21 |
| 2085/86 | Jupiter–Neptune | November 1, 2085 | January 10, 2086 | June 10, 2086 |
| 2093 | Jupiter–Uranus | May 17 | October 21 | December 5 |

Note that conjunctions in right ascension and ecliptic longitude need not take place on the same date. It is possible that there is a triple conjunction in right ascension, but not in ecliptic longitude and vice versa.

== Some triple conjunctions between 2100 and 3000 ==
| Year | Involved Planets |
|---|---|
| 2123 | Mars–Jupiter |
| 2148 | Mars–Saturn |
| 2170 | Mars–Jupiter |
| 2185 | Mars–Saturn |
| 2187 | Mars–Saturn |
| 2221 | Mars–Saturn |
| 2239 | Jupiter–Saturn |
| 2279 | Jupiter–Saturn |
| 2313 | Mars–Jupiter |
| 2319 | Mars–Saturn |
| 2388 | Mars–Saturn |
| 2456 | Mars–Jupiter |
| 2599 | Mars–Jupiter |
| 2626–27 | Mars–Saturn |
| 2629 | Mars–Saturn |
| 2655/56 | Jupiter–Saturn |
| 2663 | Mars–Saturn |
| 2699–2700 | Mars–Jupiter, Mars–Neptune and Jupiter–Neptune. |
| 2742 | Mars–Jupiter |
| 2744 | Mars–Jupiter |
| 2761 | Mars–Saturn |
| 2791 | Mars–Jupiter |
| 2794/95 | Jupiter–Saturn |
| 2829/30 | Mars–Saturn |
| 2842/43 | Mars–Jupiter |
| 2866 | Mars–Saturn |

== See also ==
- Celestial mechanics
- Great conjunction
- Positional astronomy
