= Conjunction (astronomy) =

Objects that appear to be close in the sky

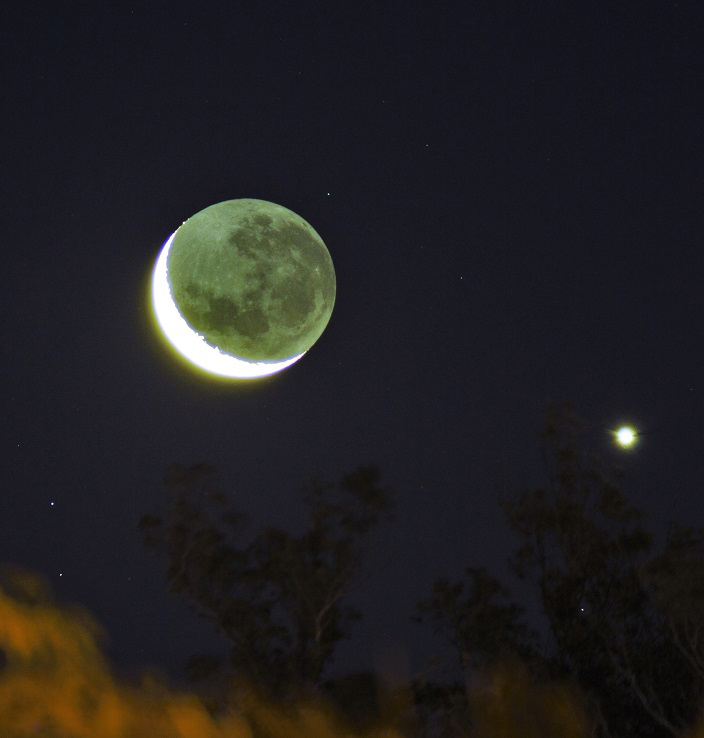
Visual conjunction between the Moon and the planet Venus, the two brightest objects in the night sky

In astronomy, a conjunction occurs when two astronomical objects or spacecraft appear to be close to each other in the sky. This means they have either the same right ascension or the same ecliptic longitude, usually as observed from Earth.

When two objects always appear close to the ecliptic—such as two planets, the Moon and a planet, or the Sun and a planet—this fact implies an apparent close approach between the objects as seen in the sky. A related word, appulse, is the minimum apparent separation in the sky of two astronomical objects.

Conjunctions involve either two objects in the Solar System or one object in the Solar System and a more distant object, such as a star. A conjunction is an apparent phenomenon caused by the observer's perspective: the two objects involved are not actually close to one another in space. Conjunctions between two bright objects close to the ecliptic, such as two bright planets, can be seen with the naked eye.

The astronomical symbol for conjunction is (Unicode U+260C ☌). The conjunction symbol is not used in modern astronomy. It continues to be used in astrology.

== Passing close ==
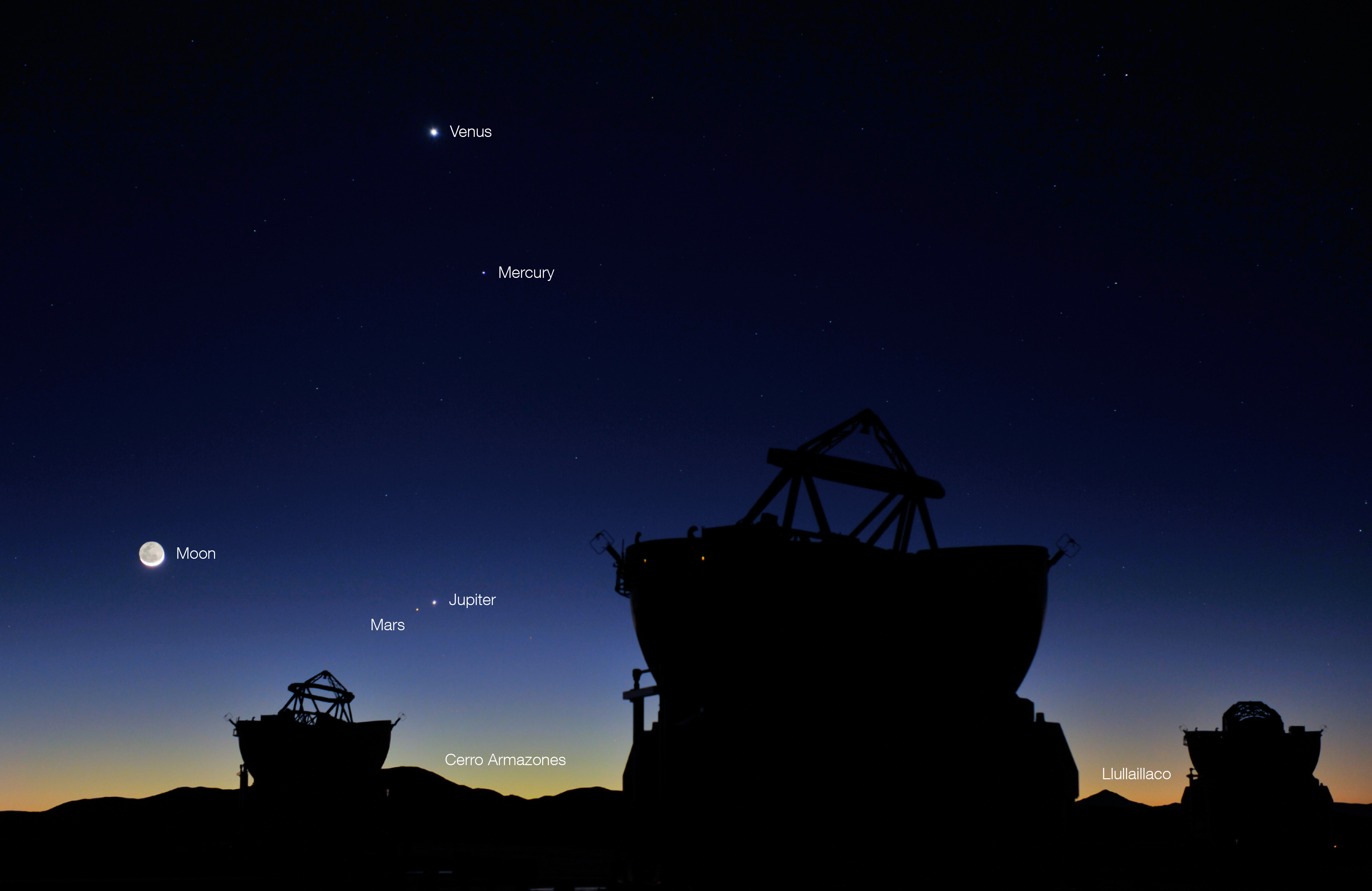
A conjunction of Mars and Jupiter in the morning of 1 May 2011, when, about an hour before sunrise, five of the Solar System's eight planets and the Moon could be seen from Cerro Paranal, Chile.

More generally, in the particular case of two planets, it means that they merely have the same right ascension (and hence the same hour angle). This is called conjunction in right ascension. However, there is also the term conjunction in ecliptic longitude. At such conjunction both objects have the same ecliptic longitude. Conjunction in right ascension and conjunction in ecliptic longitude do not normally take place at the same time, but in most cases nearly at the same time. However, at triple conjunctions, it is possible that a conjunction only in right ascension (or ecliptic length) occurs. At the time of conjunction – it does not matter if in right ascension or in ecliptic longitude – the involved planets are close together upon the celestial sphere. In the vast majority of such cases, one of the planets will appear to pass north or south of the other.

== Passing closer ==
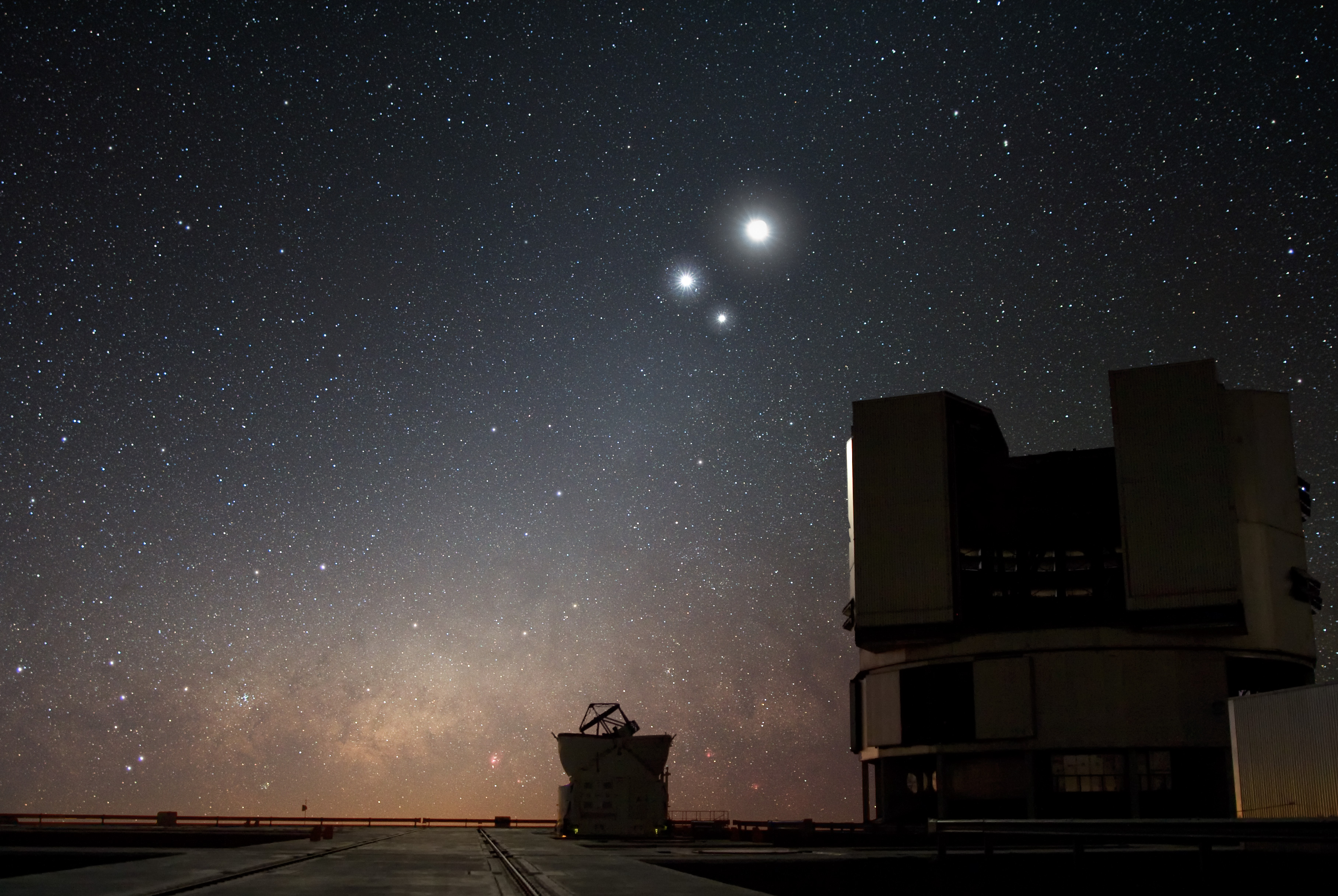
In the night sky over ESO's Very Large Telescope (VLT) observatory at Paranal, the Moon shines along with two bright companions: Venus and Jupiter.

However, if two celestial bodies attain the same declination (or ecliptic latitude) at the time of a conjunction then the one that is closer to the Earth will pass in front of the other. If one object moves into the shadow of another, the event is an eclipse. For example, the Moon passing through the shadow of Earth is called a lunar eclipse. If the visible disk of the nearer object is considerably smaller than that of the farther object, the event is called a transit, such as a transit of Mercury or a transit of Venus across the sun. When the nearer object appears larger than the farther one, it will completely obscure its smaller companion; this is called an occultation. An example of an occultation is when the Moon is relatively near and therefore large and passes between Earth and the Sun, causing the Sun to disappear entirely (a total solar eclipse). Occultations in which the larger body is neither the Sun nor the Moon are very rare. More frequent, however, is an occultation of a planet by the Moon. Several such events are visible every year from various places on Earth.

== Position of the observer ==
A conjunction, as a phenomenon of perspective, is an event that involves two astronomical bodies seen by an observer on the Earth. Times and details depend only very slightly on the observer's location on the Earth's surface, with the differences being greatest for conjunctions involving the Moon because of its relative closeness, but even for the Moon the time of a conjunction never differs by more than a few hours.

== Superior and inferior conjunctions with the Sun ==
A planet is said to be superior to another if it is farther from the sun. As seen from a superior planet, if an inferior planet is on the opposite side of the Sun, it is in superior conjunction, and it is in inferior conjunction if on the same side of the Sun. In an inferior conjunction, the superior planet is "in opposition" to the Sun as seen from the inferior planet.

The terms "inferior conjunction" and "superior conjunction" are used in particular for the planets Mercury and Venus, which are inferior planets as seen from Earth. However, this definition can be applied to any pair of planets, as seen from the one farther from the Sun.

A planet (or asteroid or comet) is simply said to be in conjunction, when it is in conjunction with the Sun, as seen from Earth. The Moon is in conjunction with the Sun at New Moon.

== Multiple conjunctions and quasiconjunctions ==
Conjunctions between two planets can be single, triple, or even quintuple. Quintuple conjunctions involve Mercury, because it moves rapidly east and west of the sun, in a synodic cycle just 116 days in length. An example will occur in 2048, when Venus, moving eastward behind the Sun, encounters Mercury five times (February 16, March 16, May 27, August 13, and September 5).

There is also a so-called quasiconjunction, when a planet in retrograde motion — always either Mercury or Venus, from the point of view of the Earth — will "drop back" in right ascension until it almost allows another planet to overtake it, but then the former planet will resume its forward motion and thereafter appear to draw away from it again. This will occur in the morning sky, before dawn. The reverse may happen in the evening sky after dusk, with Mercury or Venus entering retrograde motion just as it is about to overtake another planet (often Mercury and Venus are both of the planets involved, and when this situation arises they may remain in very close visual proximity for several days or even longer). The quasiconjunction is reckoned as occurring at the time the distance in right ascension between the two planets is smallest, even though, when declination is taken into account, they may appear closer together shortly before or after this.

== Average interval between conjunctions ==
The interval between two conjunctions involving the same two planets is not constant, but the average interval between two similar conjunctions can be calculated from the periods of the planets. The "speed" at which a planet goes around the Sun, in terms of revolutions per time, is given by the inverse of its period, and the speed difference between two planets is the difference between these. For conjunctions of two planets beyond the orbit of Earth, the average time interval between two conjunctions is the time it takes for 360° to be covered by that speed difference, so the average interval is:

$$\frac 1{|1/p_1-1/p_2|}$$

This does not apply of course to the intervals between the individual conjunctions of a triple conjunction.

Conjunctions between a planet inside the orbit of Earth (Venus or Mercury) and a planet outside are a bit more complicated. As the outer planet swings around from being in opposition to the Sun to being east of the Sun, then in superior conjunction with the Sun, then west of the Sun, and back to opposition, it will be in conjunction with Venus or Mercury an odd number of times. So the average interval between, say, the first conjunction of one set and the first of the next set will be equal to the average interval between its oppositions with the Sun. Conjunctions between Mercury and Mars are usually triple, and those between Mercury and planets beyond Mars may also be. Conjunctions between Venus and the planets beyond Earth may be single or triple.

As for conjunctions between Mercury and Venus, each time Venus goes from maximum elongation to the east of the Sun to maximum elongation west of the Sun and then back to east of the Sun (a so-called synodic cycle of Venus), an even number of conjunctions with Mercury take place. There are usually four, but sometimes just two, and sometimes six, as in the cycle mentioned above with a quintuple conjunction as Venus moves eastward, preceded by a singlet on August 6, 2047, as Venus moves westward. The average interval between corresponding conjunctions (for example the first of one set and the first of the next) is 1.599 years (583.9 days), based on the orbital speeds of Venus and Earth, but arbitrary conjunctions occur at least twice this often. The synodic cycle of Venus (1.599 years) is close to five times as long as that of Mercury (0.317 years). When they are in phase and move between the Sun and the Earth at the same time they remain close together in the sky for weeks.

The following table gives these average intervals, between corresponding conjunctions, in Julian years of 365.25 days, for combinations of the nine traditional planets. Conjunctions with the Sun are also included. Since Pluto is in resonance with Neptune the period used is 1.5 times that of Neptune, slightly different from the current value. The interval is then exactly thrice the period of Neptune.

Average interval between similar conjunctions
		Mercury	Venus	Sun	Mars	Jupiter	Saturn	Uranus	Neptune	Pluto
	Period	0.241	0.615	1.000	1.881	11.862	29.457	84.020	164.770	247.155
Mercury	0.241		1.599	0.317	2.135	1.092	1.035	1.012	1.006	1.004
Venus	0.615	1.599		1.599	2.135	1.092	1.035	1.012	1.006	1.004
Sun	1.000	0.317	1.599		2.135	1.092	1.035	1.012	1.006	1.004
Mars	1.881	2.135	2.135	2.135		2.235	2.009	1.924	1.903	1.895
Jupiter	11.862	1.092	1.092	1.092	2.235		19.859	13.812	12.782	12.460
Saturn	29.457	1.035	1.035	1.035	2.009	19.859		45.360	35.870	33.443
Uranus	84.020	1.012	1.012	1.012	1.924	13.812	45.360		171.444	127.294
Neptune	164.770	1.006	1.006	1.006	1.903	12.782	35.870	171.444		494.310
Pluto	247.155	1.004	1.004	1.004	1.895	12.460	33.443	127.294	494.310	

== Approximate conjunctions of more than two planets ==
A conjunction in which three or more planets simultaneously have the same longitude will almost surely never happen, but because the ratios of the synodic cycles are not rational numbers, this situation can be approached arbitrarily closely. In 1953 BC Mercury, Venus, Mars, Jupiter, and Saturn were all in a longitude range of 4.3° (see below). The graph below shows the standard deviation of the differences between the ecliptic longitudes of the five naked-eye planets (not including Uranus) and that of the sun, showing times when these five planets were fairly close together. In 1961 and again in 1997 Jean Meeus found several such groupings over the millennia.

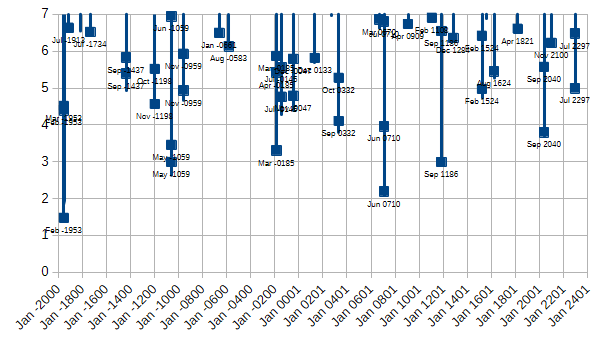
Standard deviation of ecliptic longitudes of the five classical planets, from 2000 BC through AD 2400.

Since three planets having the same longitude and the same latitude involves four equations (equating longitude and latitude of the second and third planets to those of the first) and four variables (the positions of the earth and the three other planets in their orbits), it is in principle possible to have three planets perfectly lined up. In reality this will almost surely never happen, but is approached arbitrarily closely given enough time. But by the same token, a perfect alignment of four planets as seen from Earth is not possible (there are six equations to be solved but only five variables) unless the Solar System is very special.

As explained above, each planet has a synodic period, the average period between two moments when the planet comes back to any given point in its synodic trajectory, that is, when its longitude around the sun compared to that of the earth attains a given value. Although it does not happen that two planets come back to their starting points in their synodic trajectories at the same time, there are intervals of time after which this almost happens. The more planets are included, the more difficult it is for them all to return close to their points of origin relative to the earth, as seen in the following table of examples involving all five naked-eye planets. The numbers of cycles executed by each planet in the interval is expressed as a whole number plus or minus a fraction, and the column "Maximum error" gives the maximum of the fractional parts, which is attained by two of the planets. Even in the interval of around 4249 years, this error is more than 0.012 cycles, equivalent to about 4°.

Numbers of synodic cycles of the planets in certain intervals
Julian years	Maximum error	Mercury	Venus	Mars	Jupiter	Saturn	Great conjunctions	Examples
38.351	0.117	121-0.117	24-0.011	18-0.040	35+0.117	37+0.048	2	
62.167	0.113	196-0.046	39-0.113	29+0.113	57-0.075	60+0.056	3	
100.533	0.118	317-0.118	63-0.116	47+0.080	92+0.056	97+0.118	5	1524 to 1624, 2000 to 2100
140.832	0.092	444-0.092	88+0.092	66-0.047	129-0.043	136+0.049	7	1821 to 1962
516.526	0.107	1628+0.107	323+0.093	242-0.107	473-0.028	499-0.018	26	1576 BC to 1059 BC, 185 BC to AD 332, 1524 to 240
617.036	0.079	1945-0.079	386-0.036	289-0.037	565+0.008	596+0.079	31	1576 BC to 959 BC, AD 1345 to 1962
1291.853	0.073	4072-0.019	808+0.073	605-0.013	1183-0.073	1248-0.021	65	AD 332 to 1624
1768.078	0.046	5573+0.046	1106-0.046	828+0.004	1619-0.007	1708+0.025	89	1953 BC to 185 BC, 1059 BC to AD 710, 332 to 2100
3098.295	0.062	9766-0.062	1938+0.022	1451-0.045	2837+0.046	2993+0.062	156	1576 BC to AD 1524, 1059 BC to AD 2040
4249.317	0.013	13394+0.000	2658+0.000	1990-0.013	3891+0.013	4105-0.012	214	1576 BC to AD 2297

Similar intervals can be found involving fewer planets.

The following table shows some examples of intervals in which Mars, Jupiter, and Saturn return to near their original positions relative to the sun.

Numbers of synodic cycles of the planets in certain intervals, with focus on Mars, Jupiter, and Saturn
Julian years	Maximum error excluding Mercury & Venus	Mercury	Venus	Mars	Jupiter	Saturn	Great conjunctions	Examples
2.126	0.054	7-0.300	1+0.330	1-0.005	2-0.054	2+0.054	0	
337.437	0.024	1064-0.387	211+0.071	158+0.024	309-0.016	326-0.024	17	1186 to 1524, 1624 to 1962
476.161	0.011	1501-0.122	298-0.155	223-0.010	436+0.011	460-0.011	24	710 to 1186, 1524 to 2000, 1624 to 2100
1528.923	0.006	4819+0.222	956+0.360	716+0.006	1400+0.004	1477-0.006	77	185 BC to AD 1345
1768.068	0.016	5573+0.015	1106-0.052	828+0.000	1619-0.016	1708+0.016	89	1953 BC to 185 BC, 1059 BC to AD 710, 332 to 2100
2005.086	0.017	6320+0.104	1254+0.206	939-0.003	1836+0.017	1937-0.017	101	185 BC to AD 1821
2581.671	0.016	8138-0.479	1615-0.133	1209+0.016	2364-0.016	2494-0.015	130	1059 BC to AD 1524, 959 BC to AD 1624
3057.847	0.013	9638+0.444	1913-0.279	1432+0.013	2800+0.008	2954-0.013	154	1059 BC to AD 2000, 959 BC to AD 2100
3296.993	0.011	10392+0.241	2062+0.310	1544+0.007	3019-0.011	3185+0.011	166	1953 BC to AD 1345
3773.156	0.002	11893+0.125	2360+0.156	1767-0.002	3455+0.002	3645+0.001	190	1953 BC to AD 1821

Note that these intervals are not periods or cycles – after a second interval, the plants will be twice as far from their original positions as after one interval. Each interval can be thought of as a vector whose elements are integers giving the number of cycles of the planets concerned (so the 476-year interval is the vector (23, 436, 460) of cycles of Mars, Jupiter, and Saturn). Adding intervals together can make the error either bigger or smaller. For instance adding the approximately 476-year and 3297-year intervals gives the 3773-year interval, having a much smaller error than the starting intervals. If a particular interval is repeated, the proximity of the planets (range or standard deviation of longitude) may improve at first but will then get worse.

Besides intervals that bring several planets back to their original positions with respect to the sun, there are also intervals that move them all approximately the same amount to the east or to the west. If Venus or Mercury is included, then the number of synodic cycles for Mars, Jupiter, or Saturn will not be too far from an integer, because they have to come back to the vicinity of the sun, were Venus and Mercury are. But Venus and Mercury themselves can move an arbitrary amount through their synodic cycles between two multiple conjunctions, because they can be in either the near branch or the far branch of their orbit as seen from Earth. Conjunctions with Venus normally take place when Venus is in its far branch, moving east, because it only spends about 40 days of its 1.6-year synodic cycle moving west, decreasing its ecliptic longitude by only about 20°.

We may also note that in these intervals in which Jupiter and Saturn return to about the same place relative to the sun, the fractional part of a year depends on how many great conjunctions the interval is equivalent to. This is because each time Jupiter and Saturn come close, the meeting occurs further east by J/(S−J)≈0.6746 of a full 360° along the ecliptic (where J and S are the periods of Jupiter and Saturn), so the fractional part of a year for them to be near the sun is approximately the fractional part of 0.6746 times the number of great conjunctions during the interval.

== Notable conjunctions ==
=== 15594 BC ===
Diagram of planetary motion for 15594 BC (in German language)

In that year, there was at the same opposition period a triple conjunction between Mars and Jupiter, Mars and Saturn and Jupiter and Saturn. Such an event is extremely rare and will not repeat before 16120 (source: "Sterne und Weltraum, 2/2026, Page 7)

=== 1953 BC ===
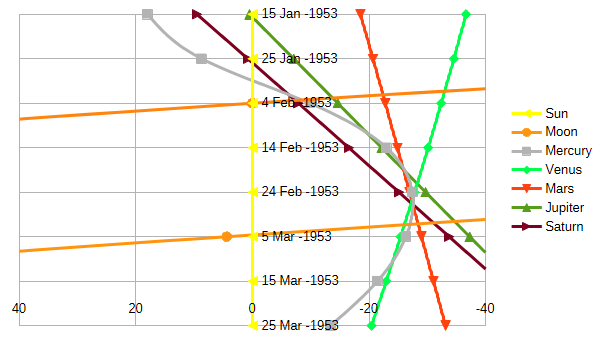
Ecliptic longitude relative to that of the sun for the planets and the moon in 1953 BC

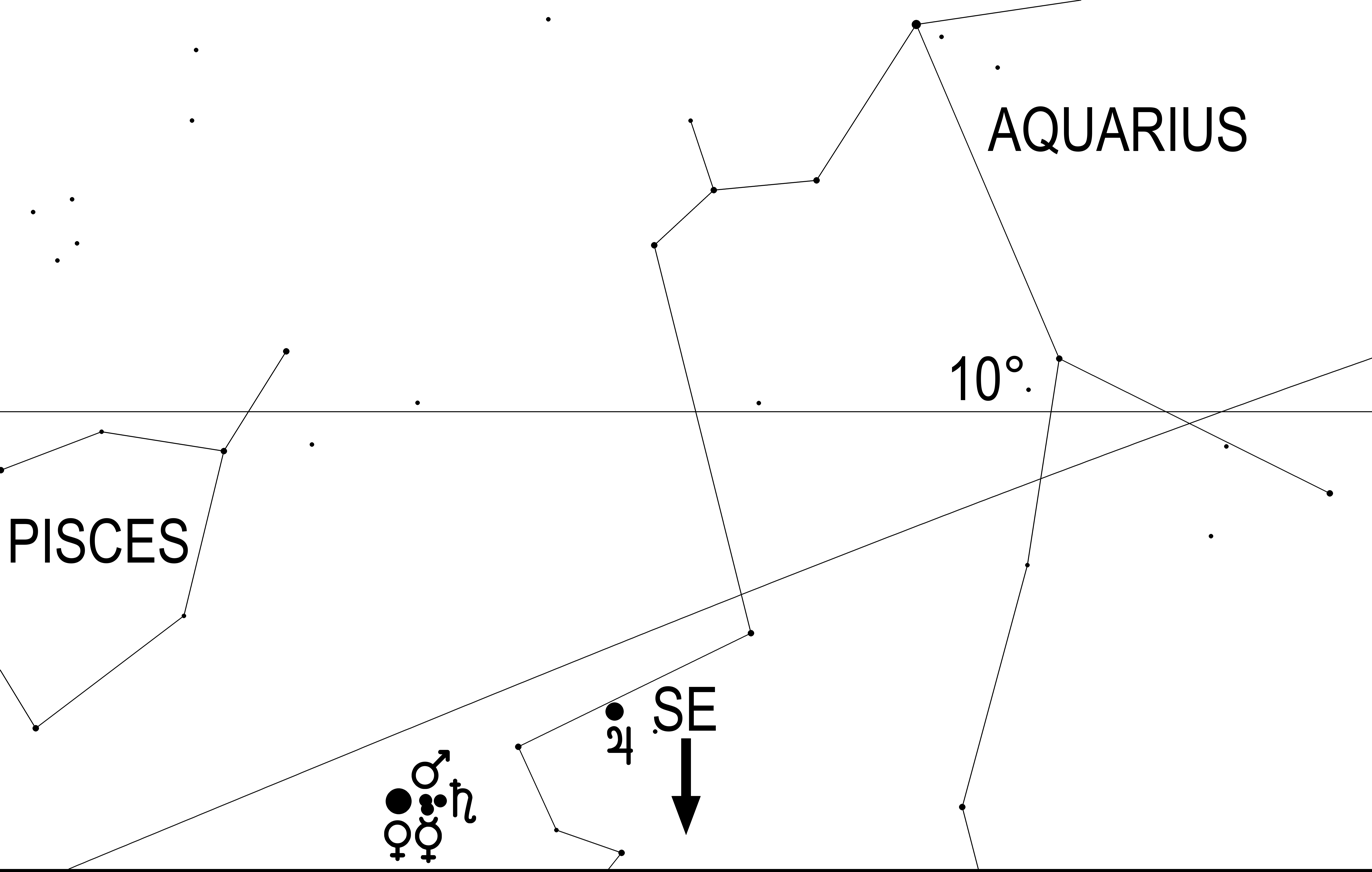
Meeting of all five bright planets on February 27, 1953, BC, for an observer at 50N 9E at 7 CET

On February 27, 1953, BC, Mercury, Venus, Mars and Saturn formed a group with an angular diameter of 26.45 arc minutes. On the same day, Jupiter was only a few degrees away, so that on this day all five bright planets could be found in an area measuring only 4.33 degrees. This was described by David Pankenier in 1984 and later by Kevin Pang. They, as well as David Nivison have suggested that this conjunction occurred at the beginning of the Xia dynasty in China.

=== 1576 BC ===
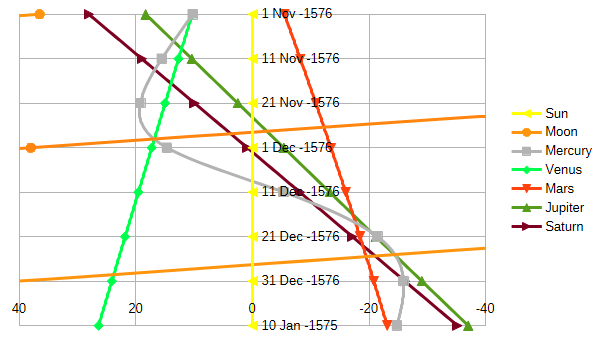
Ecliptic longitude relative to that of the sun for the planets and the moon in 1576 BC

In 1576 BC, at the time of the founding of the Shang dynasty, Chinese records say that "the five planets moved in criss-cross fashion". In early November, Mercury, Venus, Jupiter, and Saturn were together in the evening sky, with Mercury and Venus crossing Jupiter and Saturn, and in mid-December Mercury, Jupiter, and Saturn joined Mars in the morning sky, with Mars crossing Jupiter and Saturn, and Mercury crossing them twice, westward and then eastward.

=== 1059 BC ===
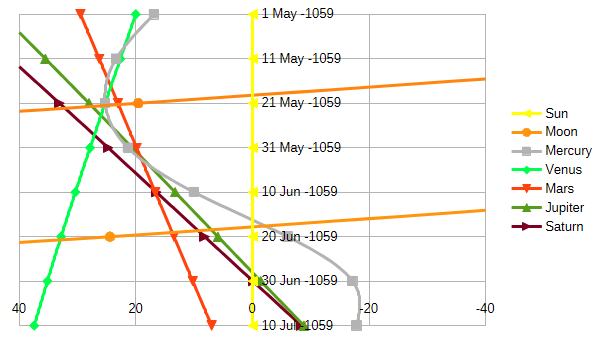
Ecliptic longitude relative to that of the sun for the planets and the moon in 1059 BC

Another five-planet conjunction occurred in 1059 BC and is mentioned in the Chinese "Bamboo Annals", though Nivison says that the Bamboo Annals moved the date one orbit of Jupiter earlier for political reasons.

=== 185 BC ===
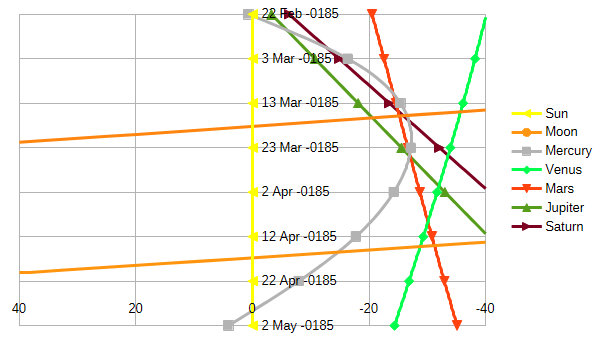
Ecliptic longitude relative to that of the sun for the planets and the moon in 185 BC

In late March of 185 BC the five planets gathered in the morning sky. The planets had all completed almost whole numbers of synodic cycles since the gathering in 1953 BC, 1768 years and a month earlier (equivalent to 89 great conjunctions), and so were in almost the same positions relative to the earth.

=== AD 710 ===
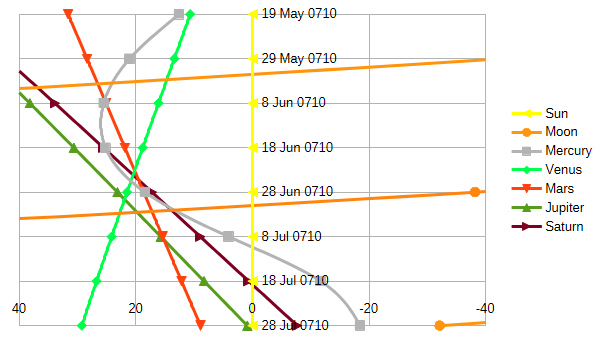
Ecliptic longitude relative to that of the sun for the planets and the moon in AD 710

On 25 June, AD 710, the five naked-eye planets were in a span of just 6° in the evening sky. This gathering was recorded by the Maya. It is the closest grouping since that of 1953 BC.

=== 1054 ===
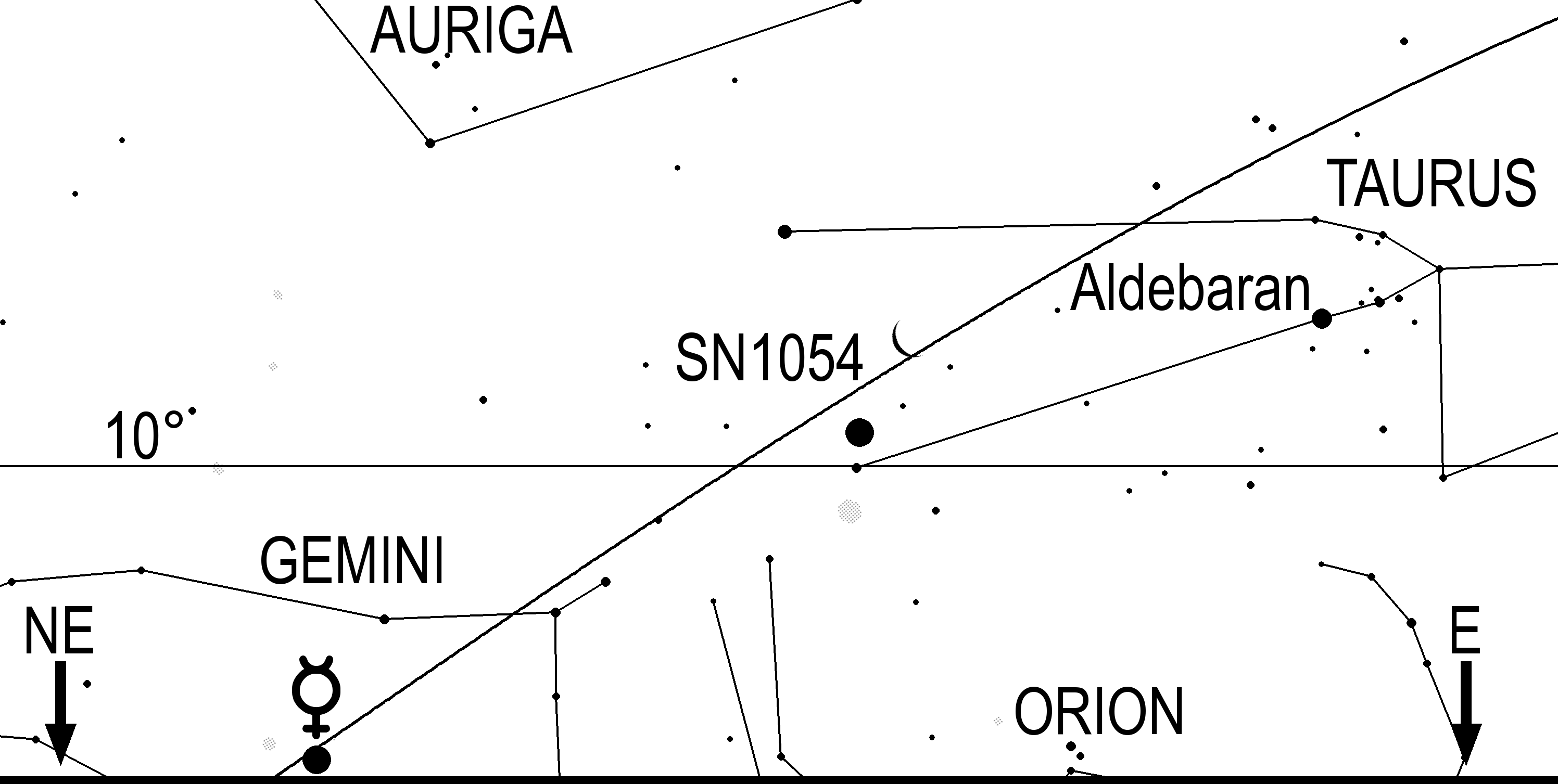
View on Supernova 1054 and the Moon on July 5, 1054, for an observer at 50N 9E at 3:15 CET

On July 5, 1054, a supernova brighter than Venus appeared in the eastern part of constellation Taurus in the proximity of the waning crescent Moon. The exact geocentric conjunction in right ascension took place at 07:58 UTC on this day with an angular separation of 3 degrees. It was perhaps the brightest star-like object in recorded history. The event is possibly shown on two petroglyphs in Arizona.

=== 1186 ===
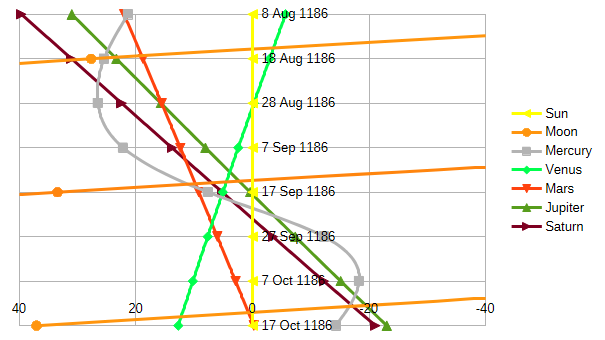
Ecliptic longitude relative to that of the sun for the planets and the moon in AD 1186

In the evening sky of September 15, 1186, Mercury and Mars were 8° east of Jupiter, with Venus and Saturn between them. The crescent moon passed through the grouping. This is the closest grouping since AD 710. A partial solar eclipse occurred on September 14 in the north.

=== 1345 ===
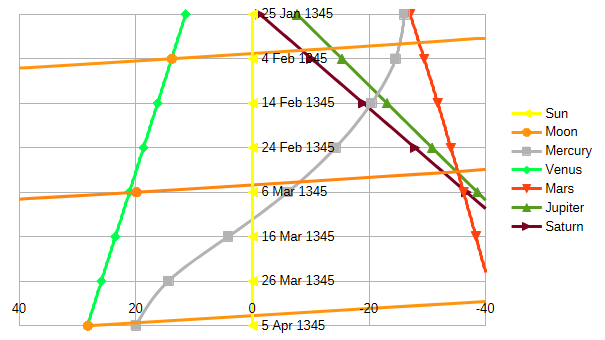
Ecliptic longitude relative to that of the sun for the planets and the moon in AD 1345

On March 4, 1345, Mars, Jupiter, and Saturn were very close together, at the same time as a solar eclipse. Guy de Chauliac blamed the Black Death on this event.

=== 1503 ===
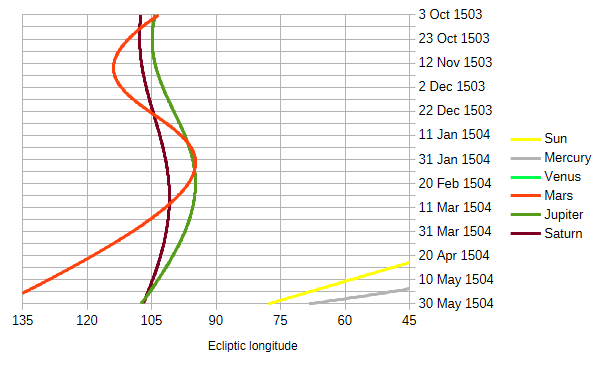
Ecliptic longitude of Mars, Jupiter, and Saturn in 1503-1504

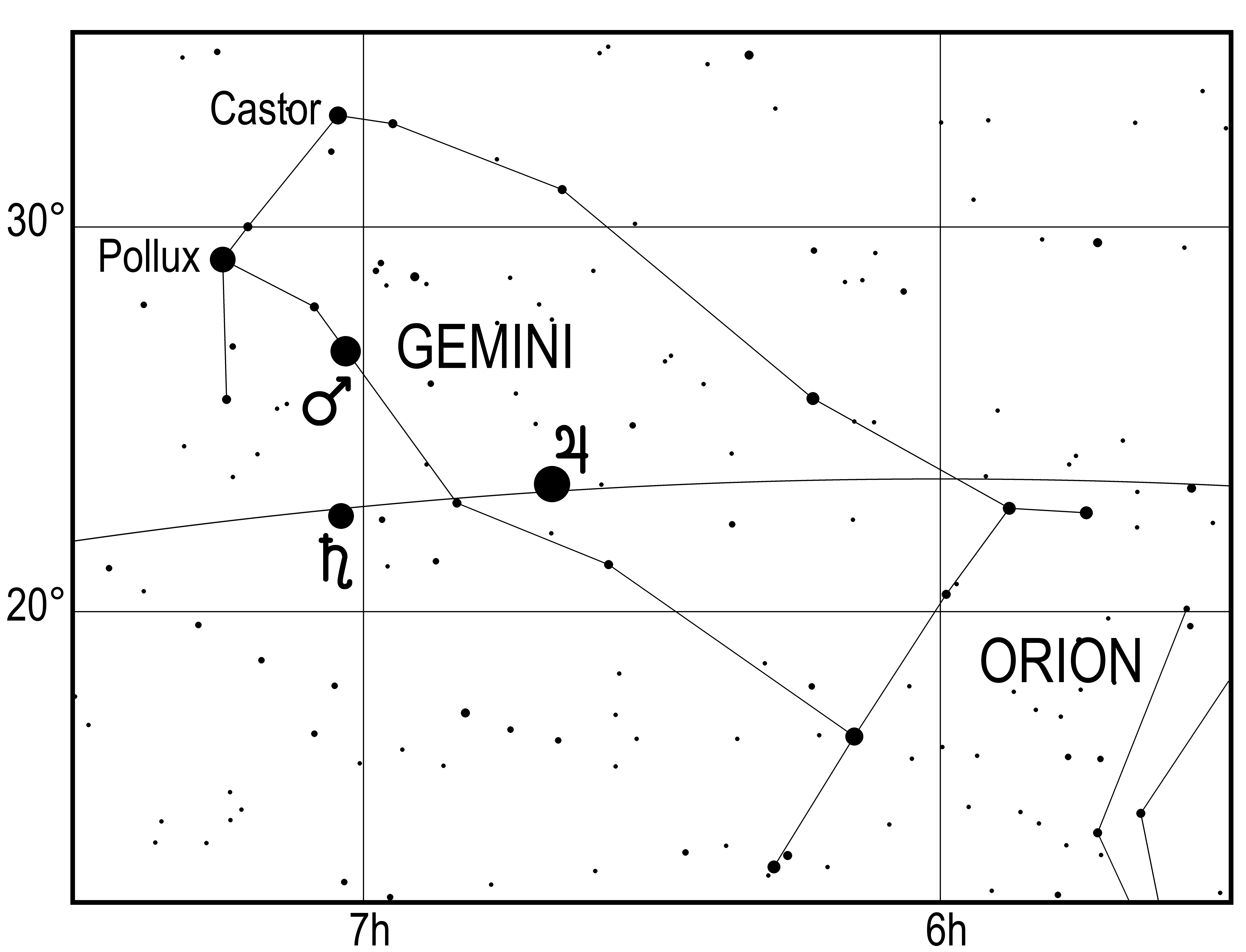
Mars, Jupiter and Saturn in the constellation Gemini on December 26, 1503

Between December 22, 1503, and December 27, 1503, all three bright outer planets Mars, Jupiter and Saturn reached their opposition to the Sun and stood therefore close together at the nocturnal sky. During the opposition period 1503 Mars stood 3 times in conjunction with Jupiter (October 5, 1503, January 19, 1504, and February 8, 1504) and 3 times in conjunction with Saturn (October 14, 1503, December 26, 1503, and March 7, 1504). However, there was no triple conjunction between Jupiter and Saturn as in 15594 BC. These planets stood on May 24, 1504, in close conjunction with an angular separation of 19 arcminutes.

=== 1524 ===
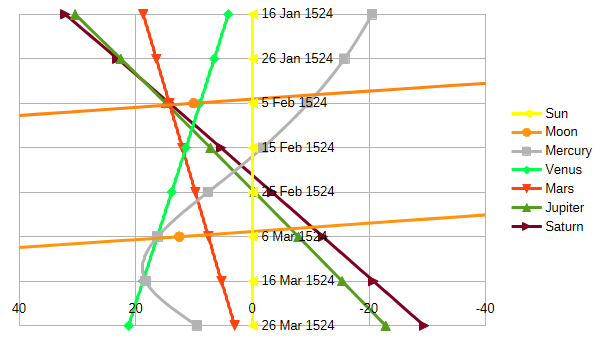
Ecliptic longitude relative to that of the sun for the planets and the moon in AD 1524

On February 19, 1524, Mercury and Saturn were in conjunction in the evening sky, with Jupiter about 2° to the east and Mars and Venus about 10° to the east.

=== 1604 ===
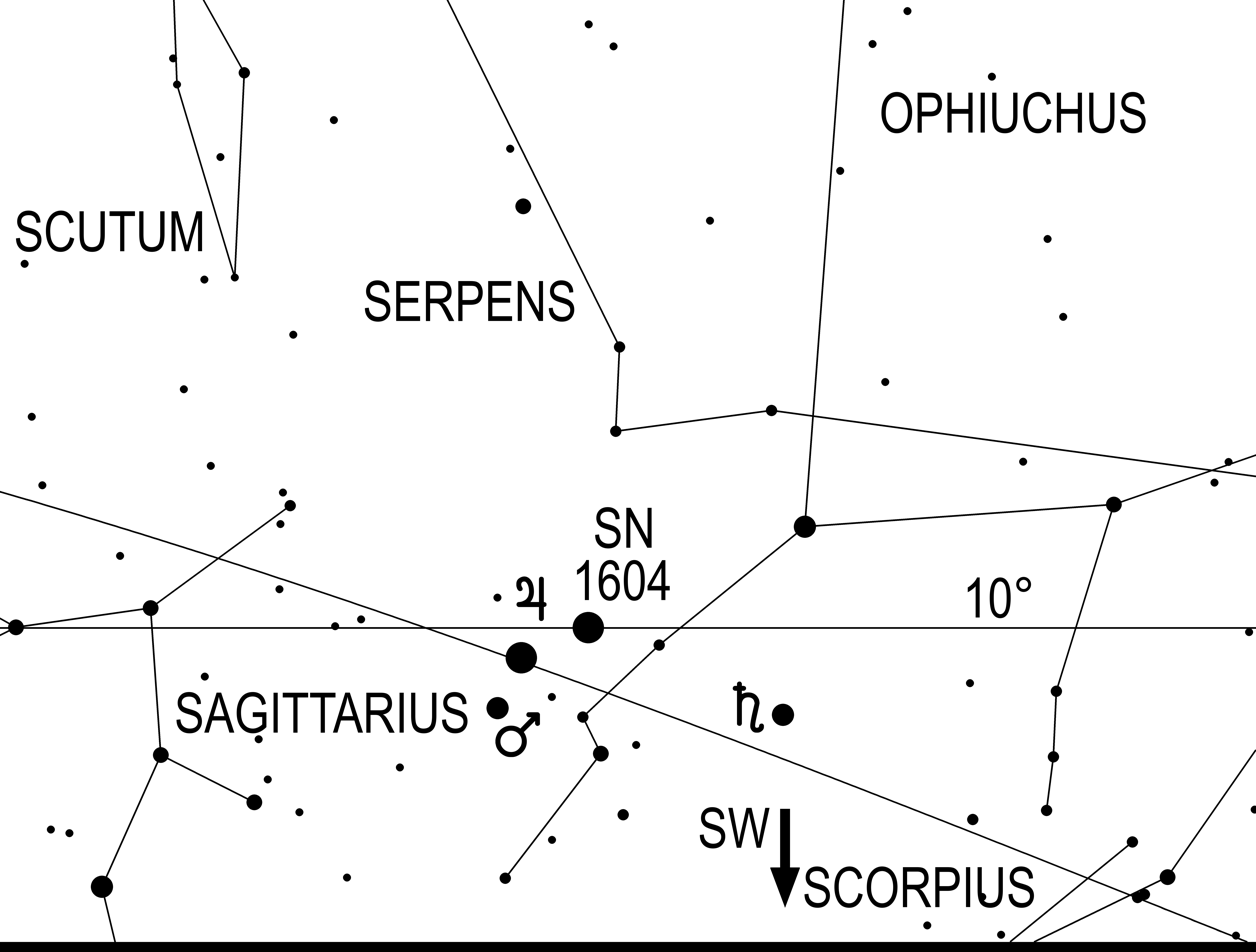
View on Mars, Jupiter, Saturn and Kepler's Supernova on October 9, 1604, for an observer at 50N 9E at 19 CET

On October 9, 1604, a conjunction between Mars and Jupiter took place, whereby Mars passed Jupiter 1.8 degrees southward. Only two degrees away from Jupiter Kepler's Supernova appeared on the same day. This was perhaps the only time in recorded history a supernova took place near a conjunction of two planets.
Saturn passed Kepler's Supernova on December 12, 1604, 33 arc minutes southly, which was however unobservable as the elongation to the sun was just 3.1 degrees. On December 24, 1604, Mercury stood in conjunction with Kepler's Supernova, whereby it was 1.8 degrees south of it. As the elongation of this event to the sun was 15 degree, it was in principle observable. On January 20, 1605, Venus passed Kepler's Supernova 29 arc minutes northwards at an elongation of 43.1 degrees to the sun.

=== 1899 ===
In early December 1899 the Sun and the naked-eye planets appeared to lie within a band 35 degrees wide along the ecliptic as seen from the Earth. As a consequence, over the period 1–4 December 1899, the Moon reached conjunction with, in order, Jupiter, Uranus, the Sun, Mercury, Mars, Saturn and Venus. Most of these conjunctions were not visible because of the glare of the Sun.

=== 1962 ===
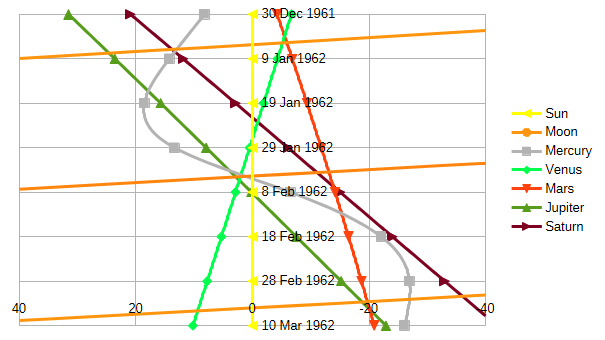
Ecliptic longitude relative to that of the sun for the planets and the moon in 1962

Over the period 4–6 February 1962, in a rare series of events, Mercury and Venus reached conjunction as observed from the Earth, followed by Venus and Jupiter, then by Mars and Saturn. Conjunctions took place between the Moon and, in turn, Mars, Saturn, the Sun, Mercury, Venus and Jupiter. Mercury also reached inferior conjunction with the Sun. The conjunction between the Moon and the Sun at new Moon produced a total solar eclipse visible in Indonesia and the Pacific Ocean, when these five naked-eye planets were visible in the vicinity of the Sun in the sky.

=== 1987 ===
Mercury, Venus and Mars separately reached conjunction with each other, and each separately with the Sun, within a 7-day period in August 1987 as seen from the Earth. The Moon also reached conjunction with each of these bodies on 24 August. However, none of these conjunctions were observable due to the glare of the Sun.

=== 2000 ===
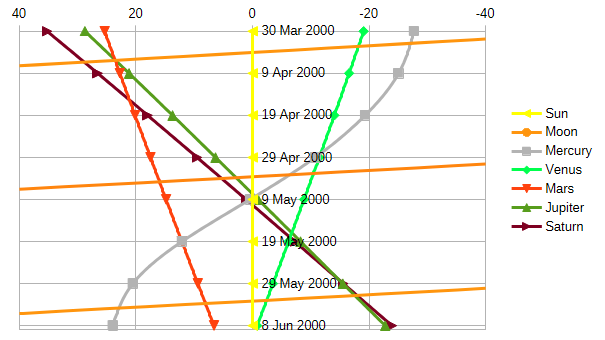
Ecliptic longitude relative to that of the sun for the planets and the moon in early 2000

In May 2000, in a very rare event, several planets lay in the vicinity of the Sun in the sky as seen from the Earth, and a series of conjunctions took place. Jupiter, Mercury and Saturn each reached conjunction with the Sun in the period 8–10 May. These three planets in turn were in conjunction with each other and with Venus over a period of a few weeks. However, most of these conjunctions were not visible from the Earth because of the glare from the Sun. NASA referred to May 5 as the date of the conjunction.

=== 2002 ===
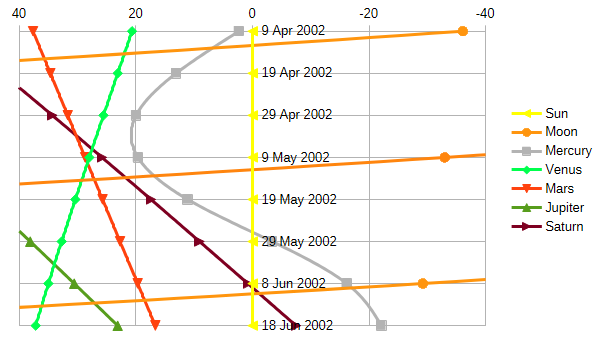
Ecliptic longitude relative to that of the sun for the planets and the moon in Spring 2002

Venus, Mars and Saturn appeared close together in the evening sky in early May 2002, with a conjunction of Mars and Saturn occurring on 4 May. This was followed by a conjunction of Venus and Saturn on 7 May, and another of Venus and Mars on 10 May when their angular separation was only 18 arcminutes. A series of conjunctions between the Moon and, in order, Saturn, Mars and Venus took place on 14 May, although it was not possible to observe all these in darkness from any single location on the Earth.

=== 2007 ===
A conjunction of the Moon and Mars took place on 24 December 2007, very close to the time of the full Moon and at the time when Mars was at opposition to the Sun. Mars and the full Moon appeared close together in the sky worldwide, with an occultation of Mars occurring for observers in some far northern locations. A similar conjunction took place on 21 May 2016 and on 8 December 2022.

=== 2008 ===
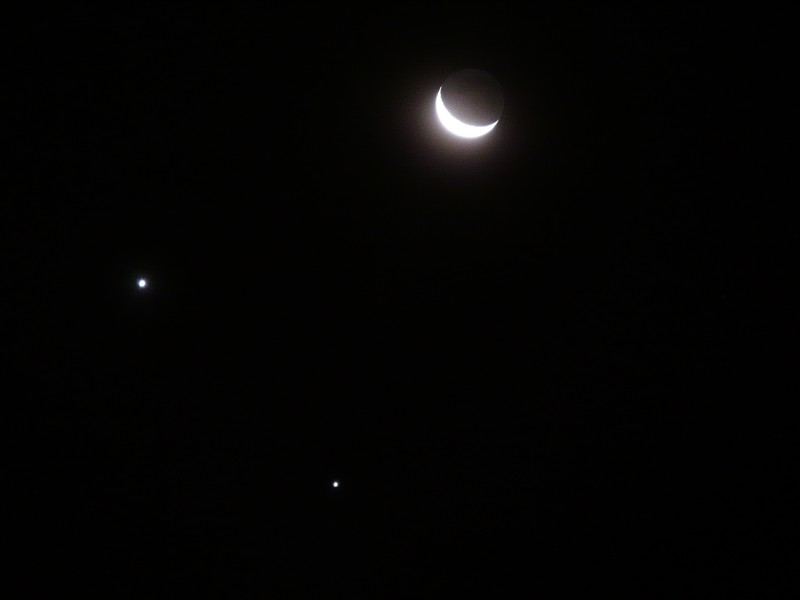
Conjunction of Venus (left) and Jupiter (bottom), with the nearby crescent Moon, seen from São Paulo, Brazil, on 1 December 2008

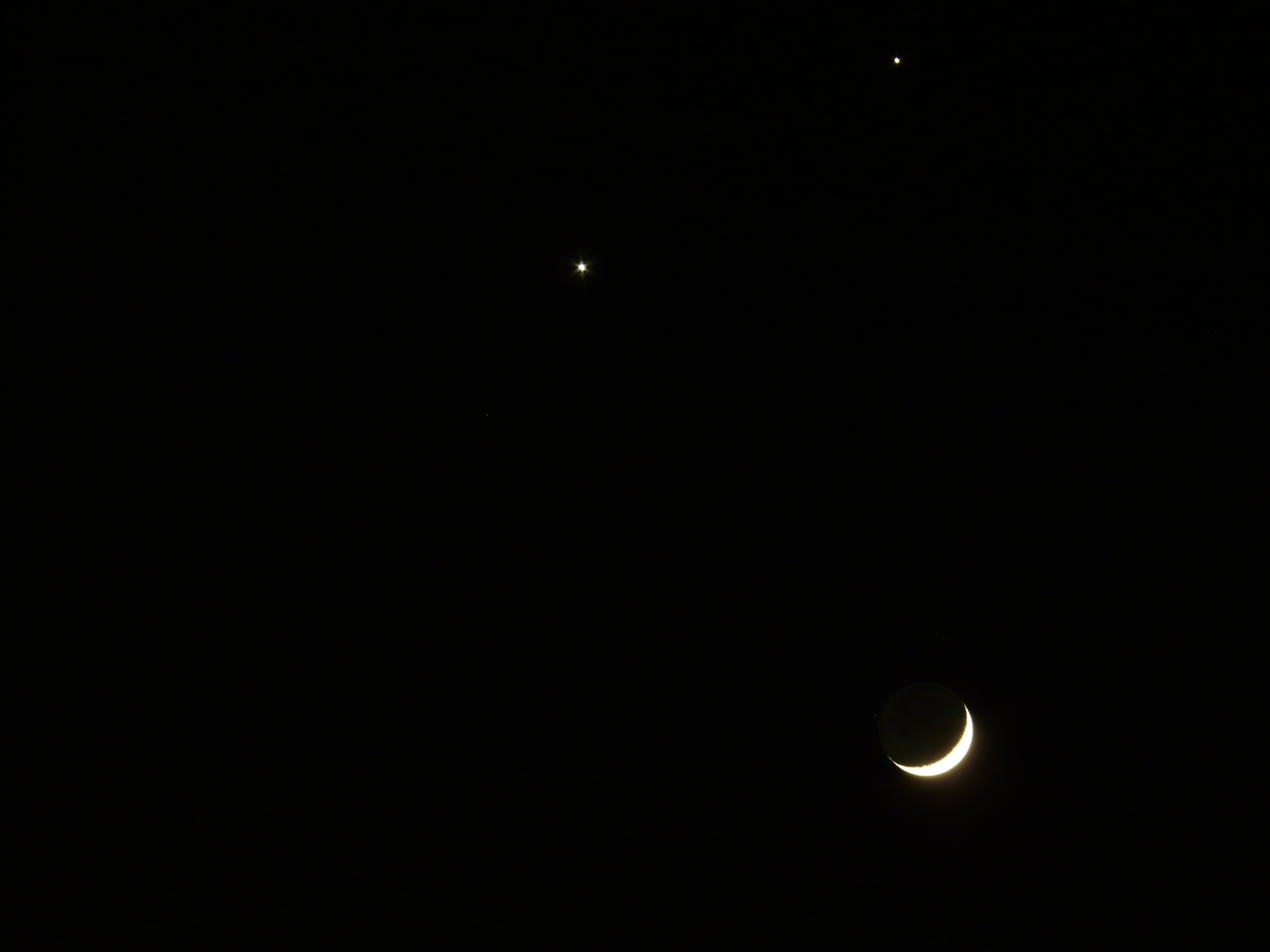
Conjunction of the Moon, Venus, and Jupiter, seen from Quzhou, China on 1 December 2008.

A conjunction of Venus and Jupiter occurred on 1 December 2008, and several hours later both planets separately reached conjunction with the crescent Moon. An occultation of Venus by the Moon was visible from some locations. The three objects appeared close together in the sky from any location on the Earth.

=== 2013 ===
At the end of May, Mercury, Venus and Jupiter went through a series of conjunctions only a few days apart.

=== 2015 ===
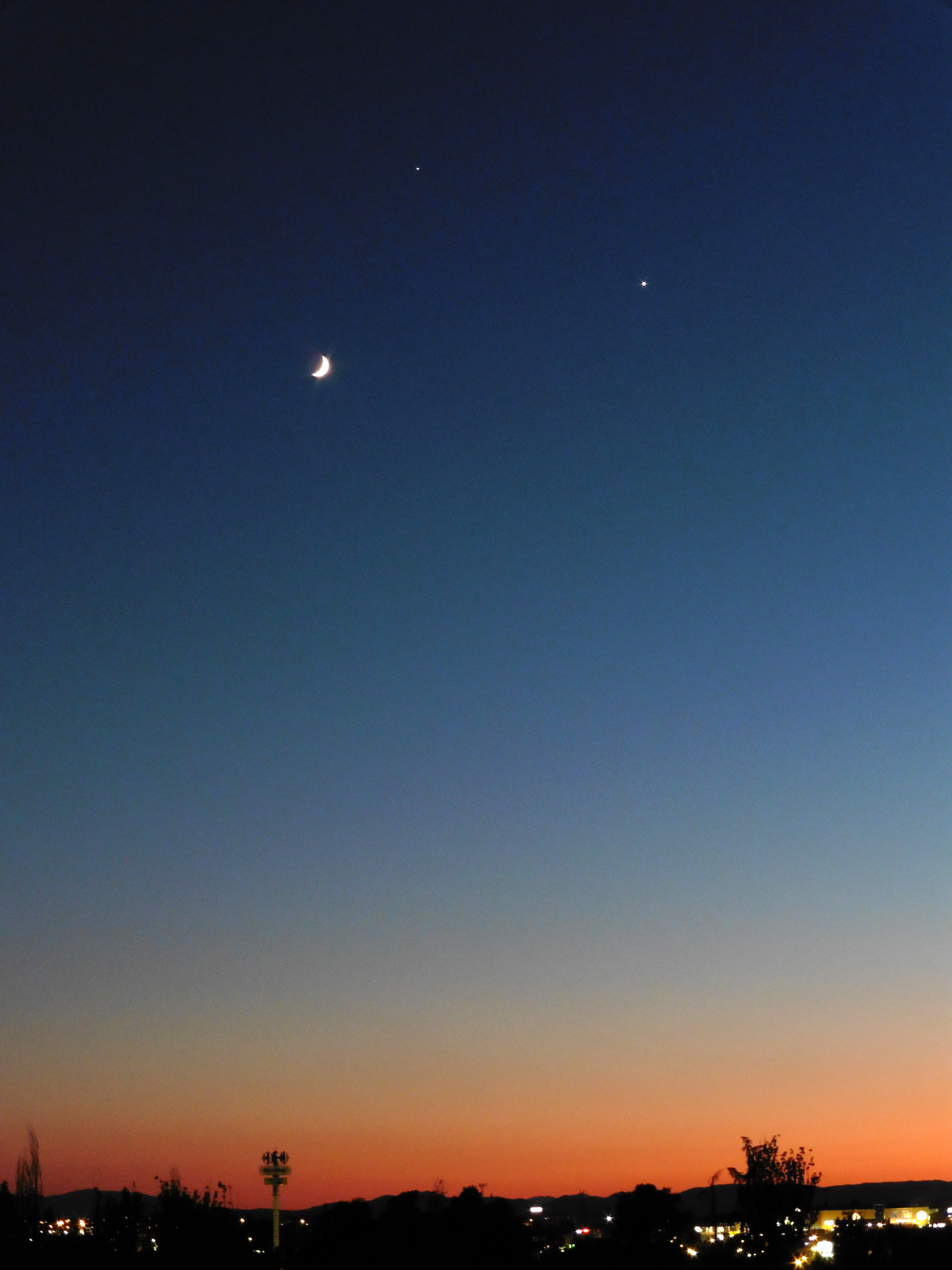
Moon, Jupiter (top), and Venus (right) at dusk seen from Madrid, Spain, on 20 June 2015

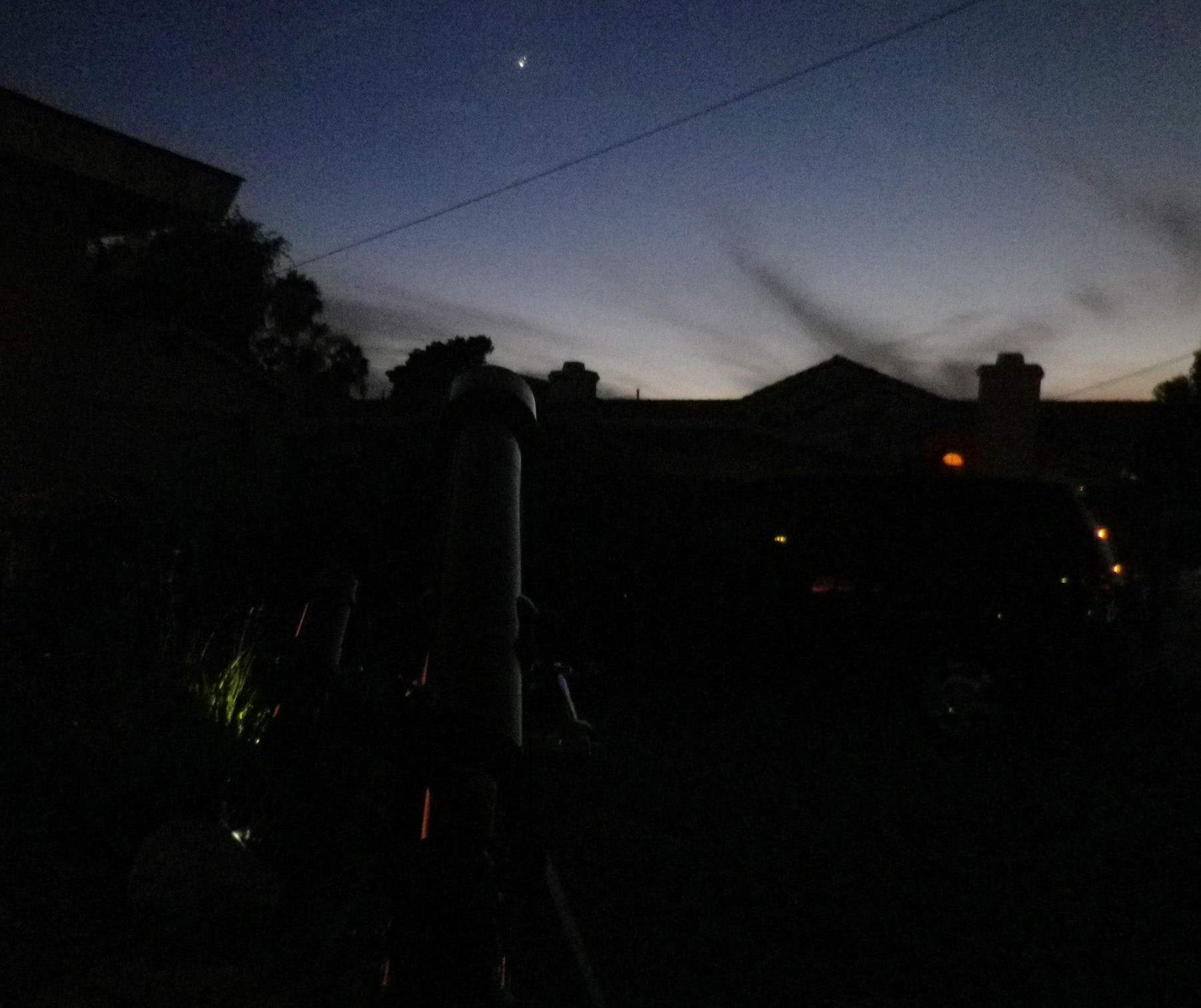
Venus–Jupiter conjunction of June 30, 2015

June 30 – Venus and Jupiter come close together in a planetary conjunction; they came approximately 1/3 a degree apart. The conjunction had been nicknamed the "Star of Bethlehem."

=== 2016 ===
On the morning of January 9, Venus and Saturn came together in a conjunction

On August 27, Mercury and Venus were in conjunction, followed by a conjunction of Venus and Jupiter, meaning that the three planets were very close together in the evening sky.

=== 2017 ===
On the morning of November 13, Venus and Jupiter were in conjunction, meaning that they appeared close together in the morning sky.

=== 2018 ===
On the early hours of January 7, Mars and Jupiter were in conjunction. The pair was only 0.25 degrees apart in the sky at its closest.

=== 2020 ===
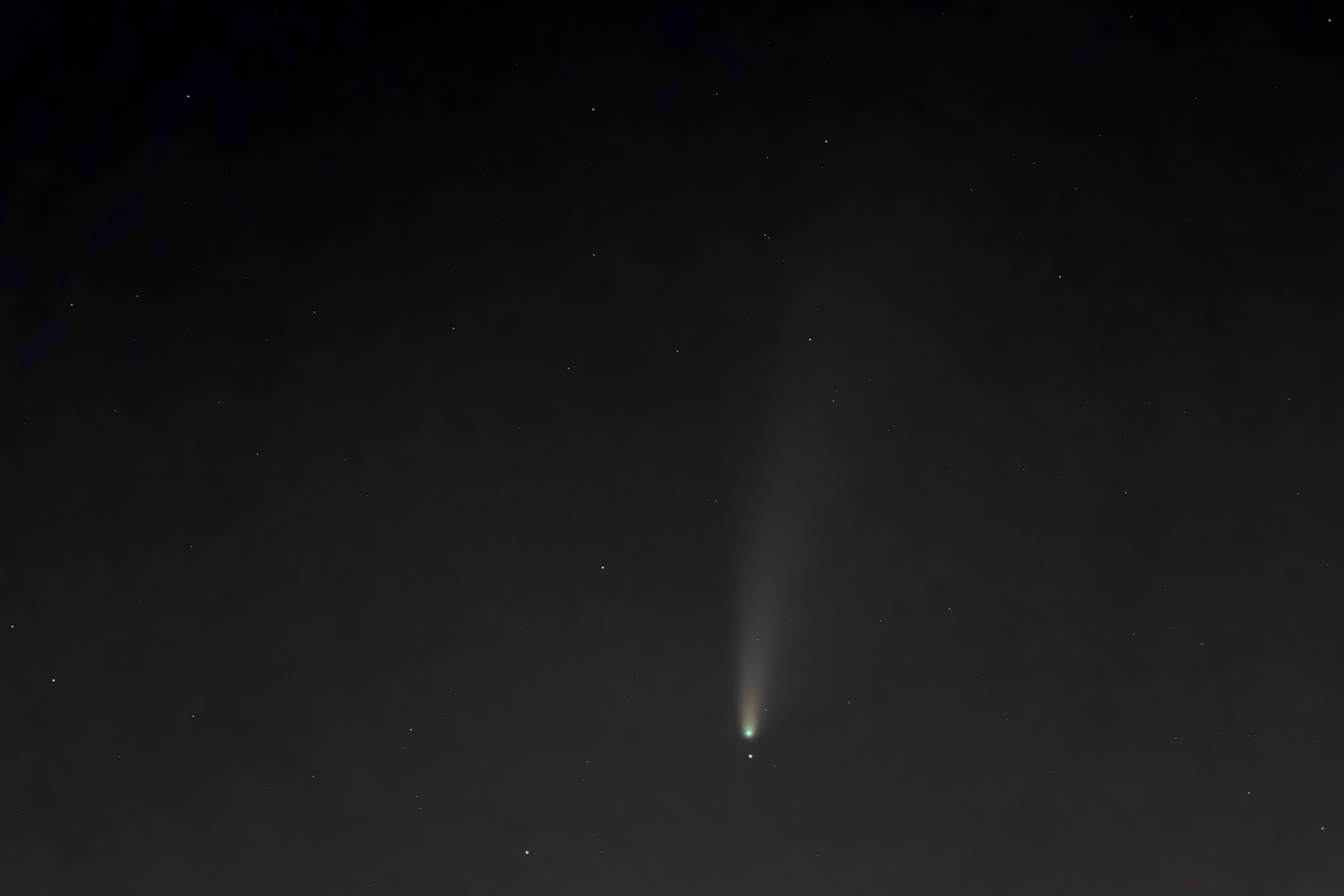
Talitha Borealis in conjunction with the comet C/2020 F3 (NEOWISE) on 18 July 2020 21:30 UTC with an attitude von 17° above the north horizon of Berlin (image height = 4°). At the lower edge of the picture, a bit left from the centre there is the neighbour star Alkaphrah (Kappa Ursae Majoris respectively Talitha Australis). The distance between Talitha Borealis and C/2020 F3 was seven arc minutes.

During most of February, March, and April, Mars, Jupiter, and Saturn were close to each other, and so they underwent a series of conjunctions: on March 20, Mars was in conjunction with Jupiter, and on March 31, Mars was in conjunction with Saturn. On December 21, Jupiter and Saturn appeared at their closest separation in the sky since 1623, in an event known as a great conjunction.

=== 2022 ===
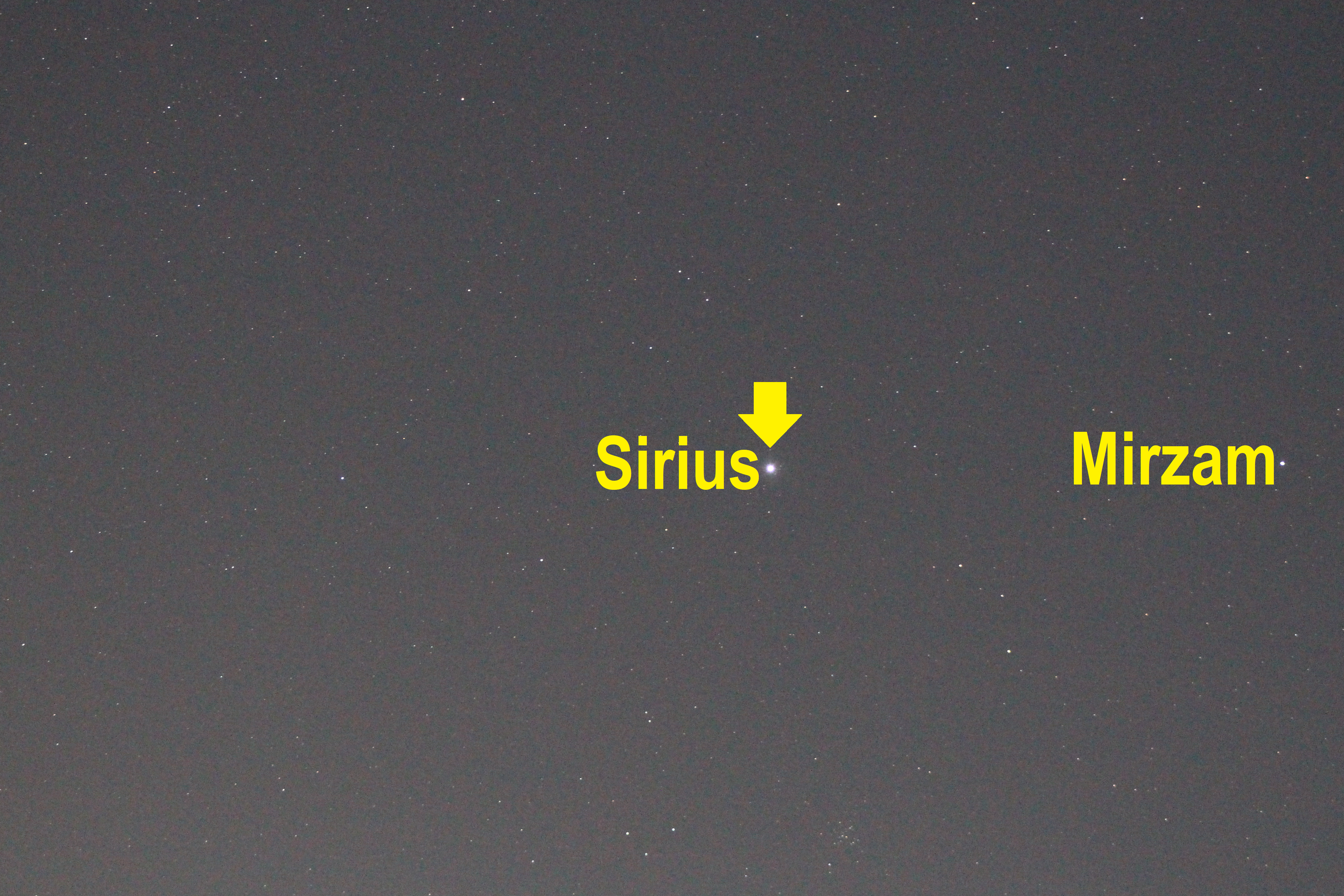
Conjunction of Sirius and Pallas (marked with an arrow) on October 9, 2022, photographed with an objective with a focal length of 75 millimetres

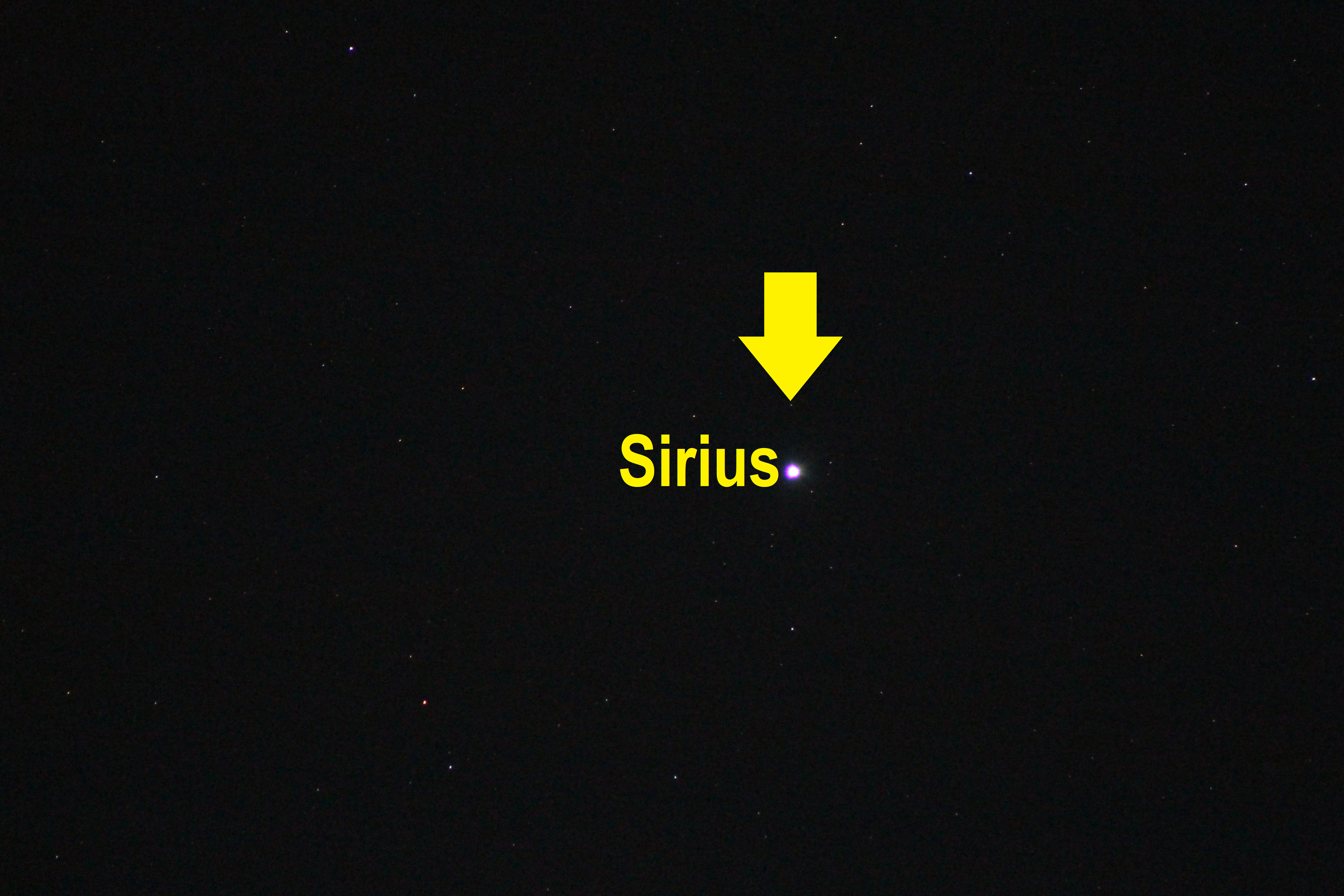
Conjunction of Sirius and Pallas (marked with an arrow) on October 9, 2022, photographed with an objective with a focal length of 300 millimetres

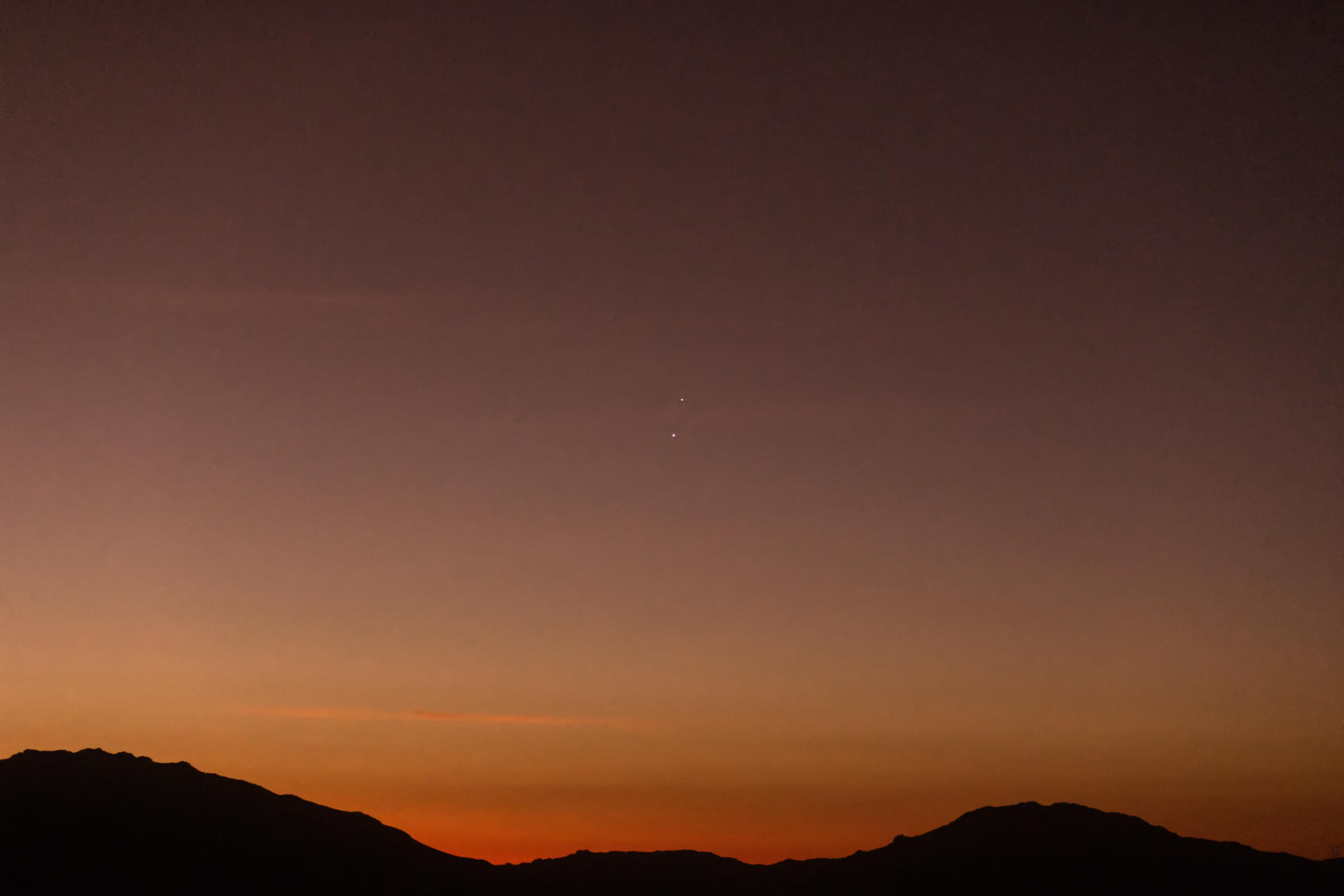
Venus and Jupiter on 1 March 2023 from South Africa

Planetoid Pallas passed Sirius, the brightest star in the night sky, on October 9 to the south at a distance of 8.5 arcminutes (source: Astrolutz 2022, ISBN 978-3-7534-7124-2). As Sirius is far south of the ecliptic only few objects of the solar system can be seen from earth close to Sirius.
At this occasion Pallas had not only the lowest angular distance to Sirius in the 21st century, but also since its discovery in 1802.
In the 19th century the greatest approach of Pallas and Sirius took place on October 11, 1879, when 8.6 mag bright Pallas passed Sirius 1.3° southwest and in the 20th century the lowest distance between Pallas and Sirius was reached on October 12, 1962, when Pallas, whose brightness was also 8.6 mag, stood 1.4° southwest of the brightest star in the sky.

=== 2024 ===
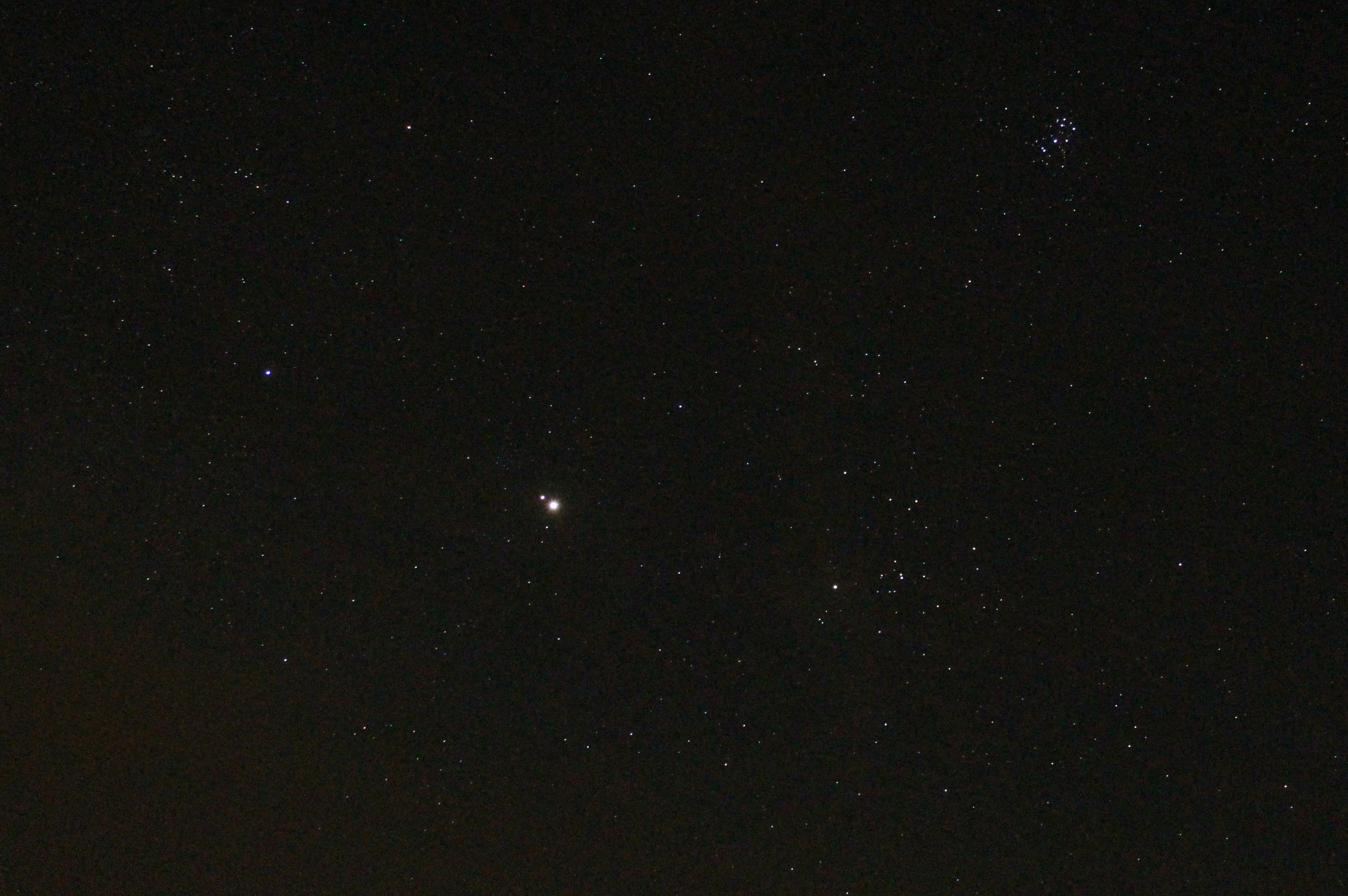
Conjunction of Mars with Jupiter on August 15, 2024

On August 15, 2024, there was an excellently visible conjunction between Mars and Jupiter in Taurus constellation.

=== 2025 ===
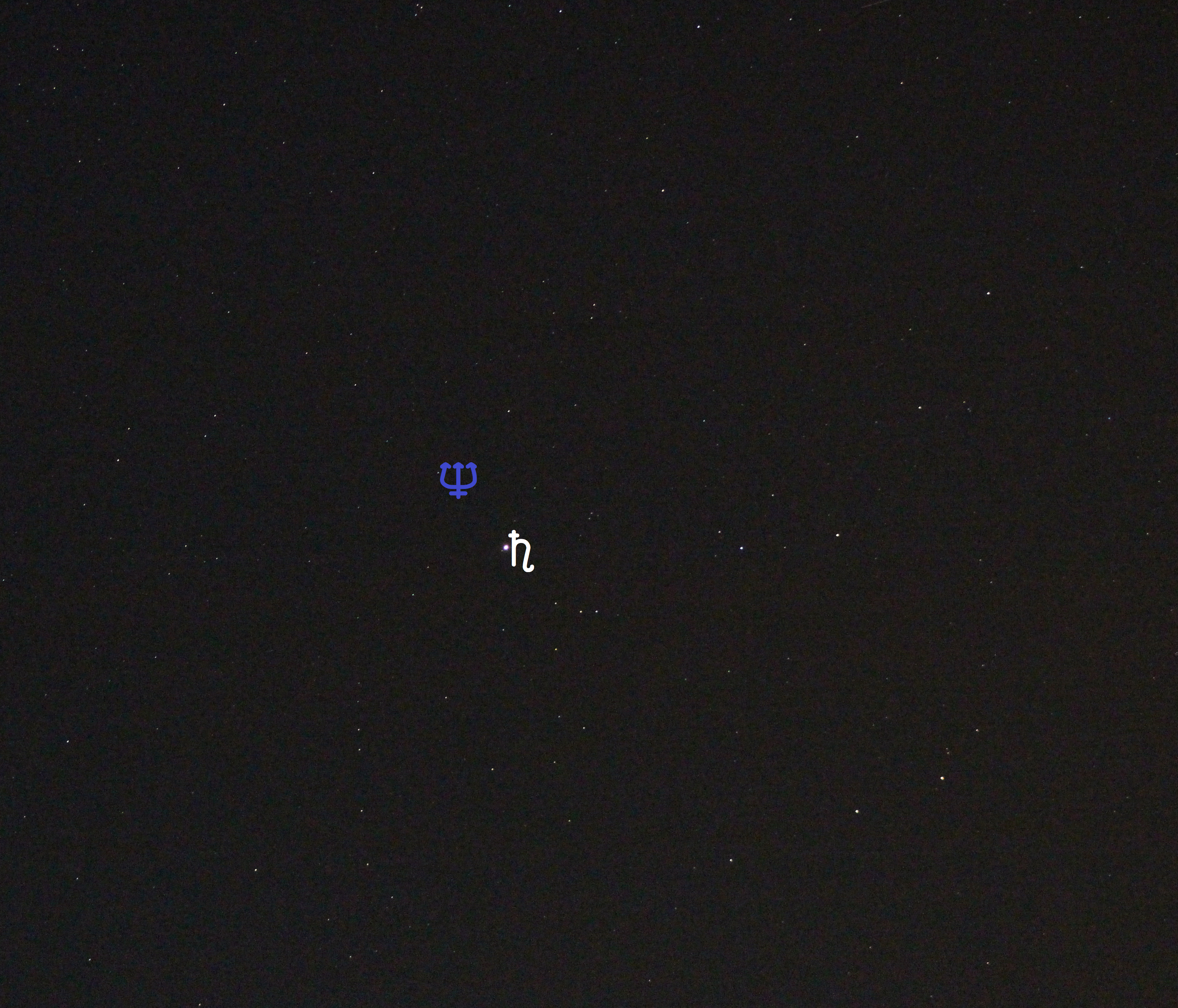
Conjunction of Saturn with Neptune on June 29, 2025. At this conjunction Neptune stood 59.3 arc minutes north of Saturn

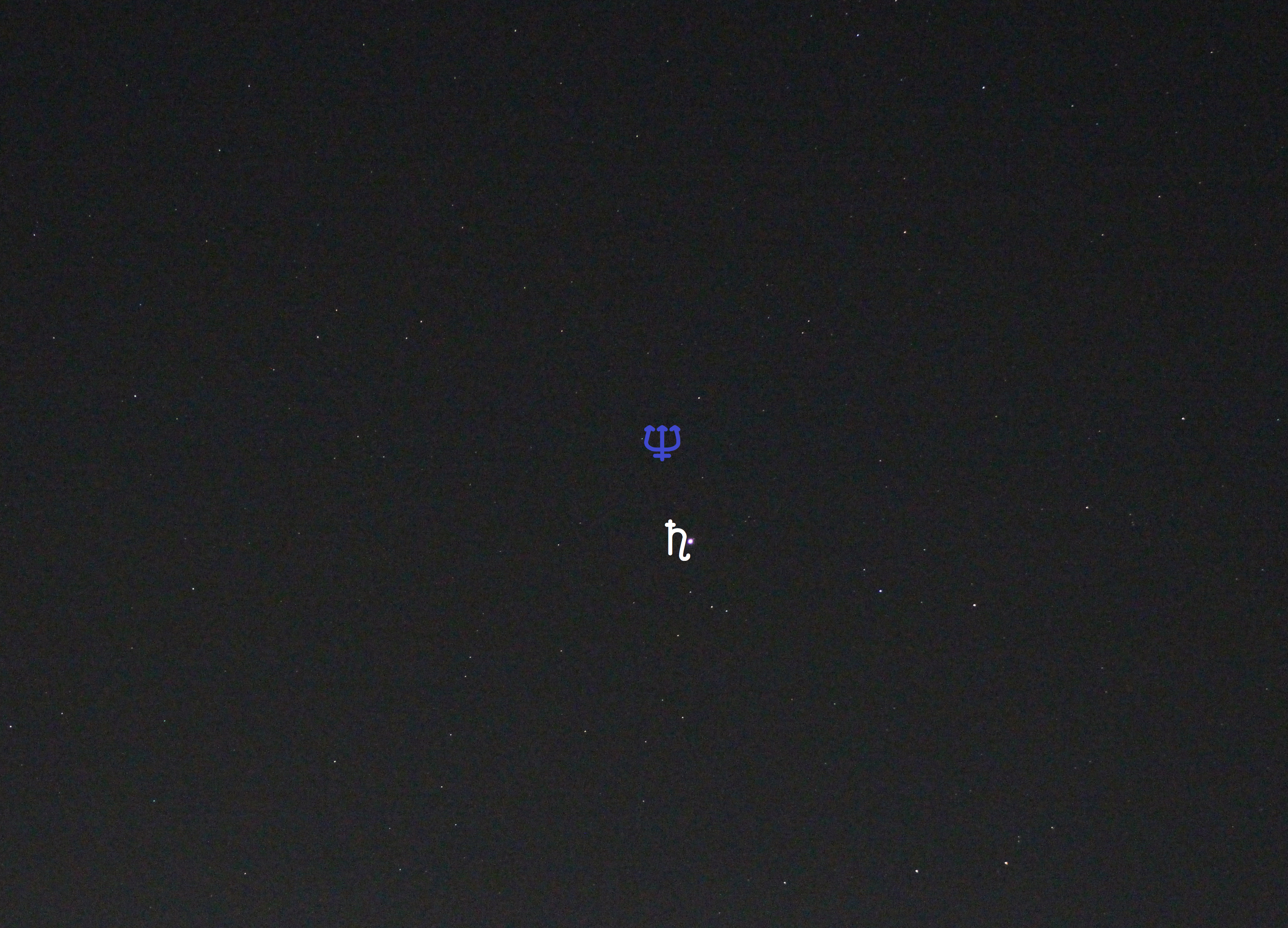
Conjunction of Saturn with Neptune on August 6, 2025. At this conjunction Neptune stood 1.14 degrees north of Saturn

On June 29, 2025, there was the first conjunction of Saturn with Neptune with angular distance of 59.3 arc minutes. The second conjunction of this triple conjunction was on August 6, 2025, whereby Saturn was 1.14 degrees south of Neptune.

The third and last conjunction of this triple took place on February 16, 2026. On this day, Saturn stood 54.7 arc minutes south of Neptune.

After 2026, the next conjunction between Saturn and Neptune will be on June 7, 2061.

=== 2026 ===
Conjunction of Mars with Jupiter on November 15, 2026

On November 15, 2026, there was an excellently visible conjunction between Mars and Jupiter in Leo constellation, which had an elongation of 86.95 deg west of the sun.

=== 2040 ===
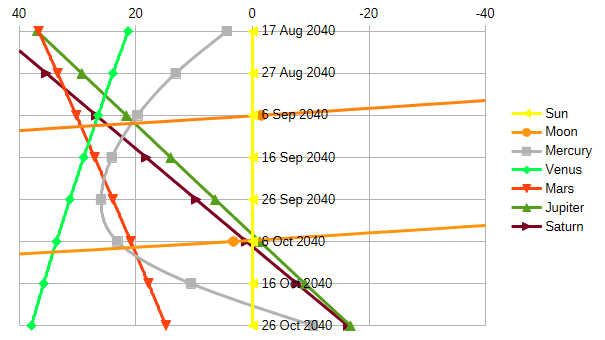
Ecliptic longitude relative to that of the sun for the planets and the moon in Autumn 2040

On 9 September 2040, all five naked-eye planets and the moon will be gathered close together in the evening sky. This is the closest grouping since that of AD 1186.

== See also ==
- Appulse
- Astrometry
- Astronomical transit
  - Transit of Earth from Mars
  - Transit of Mercury
  - Transit of Venus
- Occultation
- Elongation (astronomy)
- Great conjunction
- Opposition (astronomy)
- Planetary parade
- Spherical astronomy
- Syzygy (astronomy)
- Triple conjunction
