= Benjamin Boss =

American astronomer

- Born: 9 January 1880; Albany, New York
- Died: 17 October 1970 (aged 90); Albany, New York
- Education: The Albany Academy; Harvard University
- Parent(s): Lewis Boss; Helen M. (Hutchinson) Boss
- Scientific career
- Fields: Astronomy
- Workplaces: Dudley Observatory; U. S. Naval Observatory; Carnegie Institution of Washington

Benjamin Boss (January 9, 1880 – October 17, 1970) was an American astronomer. He served as the director of both the Dudley Observatory in Schenectady, New York and the Department of Meridian Astrometry of the Carnegie Institution of Washington.

== Biography ==
Boss was born in Albany, New York to astronomer Lewis Boss and Helen M. (Hutchinson) Boss. After attending The Albany Academy, he graduated from Harvard University in 1901 and worked at Dudley Observatory until 1905. Following a year at the U. S. Naval Observatory in Washington, D.C., he became director of the U.S. Naval Observatory at Samoa and helped organized the expedition to Flint Island to observe the 1908 solar eclipse. He served as director from 1906 to 1908.

He joined the Department of Meridian Astrometry of the Carnegie Institution of Washington in 1908, working as a secretary until 1912 when he became acting director. In 1915, he became director of the department. He also served as director of Dudley Observatory from 1912 to 1956. His primary work was in positional astronomy, particularly in the positions and motions of the stars.

His father served as editor of the Astronomical Journal from 1909 until his death 1912, whereupon Benjamin undertook the duty until 1941. In 1936 his General Catalogue of 33,342 Stars was published by the Carnegie Institution of Washington, DC. This publication replaced the Preliminary General Catalogue of 6,188 stars of Lewis Boss, and it became known as the Boss General Catalogue. (Star designations that began with GC are from this catalogue.)

Boss died on October 17, 1970, in Albany, New York.

== Bibliography ==
- Benjamin Boss; et al. (1936). General Catalogue of 33342 stars for the epoch 1950 (1st ed.). Washington, D.C.: Carnegie Institution of Washington Publication. Bibcode:1936gcts.book.....B.
- Boss, Benjamin (2007). "Benjamin Boss". Dudley Observatory. Archived from the original on 2014-03-26.
