= Quadrature (astronomy) =

Aspect of a heavenly body in which it makes a right angle with the direction of the Sun

Diagram showing the eastern and western quadratures of a superior planet like Mars

In spherical astronomy, quadrature is the configuration of a celestial object in which its elongation is a right angle (90 degrees), i.e., the direction of the object as viewed from Earth is perpendicular to the position of the Sun relative to Earth. It is applied especially to the position of a superior planet or the Moon at its first and last quarter phases. This is not to be confused with the Moon at dichotomy (exactly half-lit) as viewed from Earth, which occurs at 89.85 degrees and 270.15 degrees.

As shown in the diagram, a planet (or other object) can be at the western quadrature (when it is to the west of the Sun when viewed from the Earth) or at the eastern quadrature (when it is to the east of the Sun when viewed from the Earth). Note that an inferior planet can never be at quadrature to the reference planet.

At quadrature, the shadow that a planet casts on its planetary rings or moons appears most offset from the planet (e.g., Saturn's rings); the dark side of a planet (e.g., Mars) is maximally visible.

Since the Sun is not infinitely far away, the Moon is slightly past first quarter phase when the Sun and Moon are perpendicular in the sky to each other.

When the Sun and Moon are at right angles, their tidal forces counteract each other, and the tidal range is smaller than average, resulting in neap tides.

== See also ==
- Astrological aspect
