= Norman H. Baker =

American astronomer

Norman Hodgson Baker was a professor of astrophysics at Columbia University. He was born in Fergus Falls, Minnesota on October 23, 1931, and died on October 11, 2005, in Watertown, New York. His research primarily involved computational investigations of stellar structure and evolution; in particular, he focused on pulsating variable stars and he is considered as one of the founders of modern pulsation theory. From 1975 until 1983, he was the editor of the Astronomical Journal and served as president of IAU Commission 27 during the term of 1982 - 1985.
