= Appulse =

Apparent least distance between two celestial objects

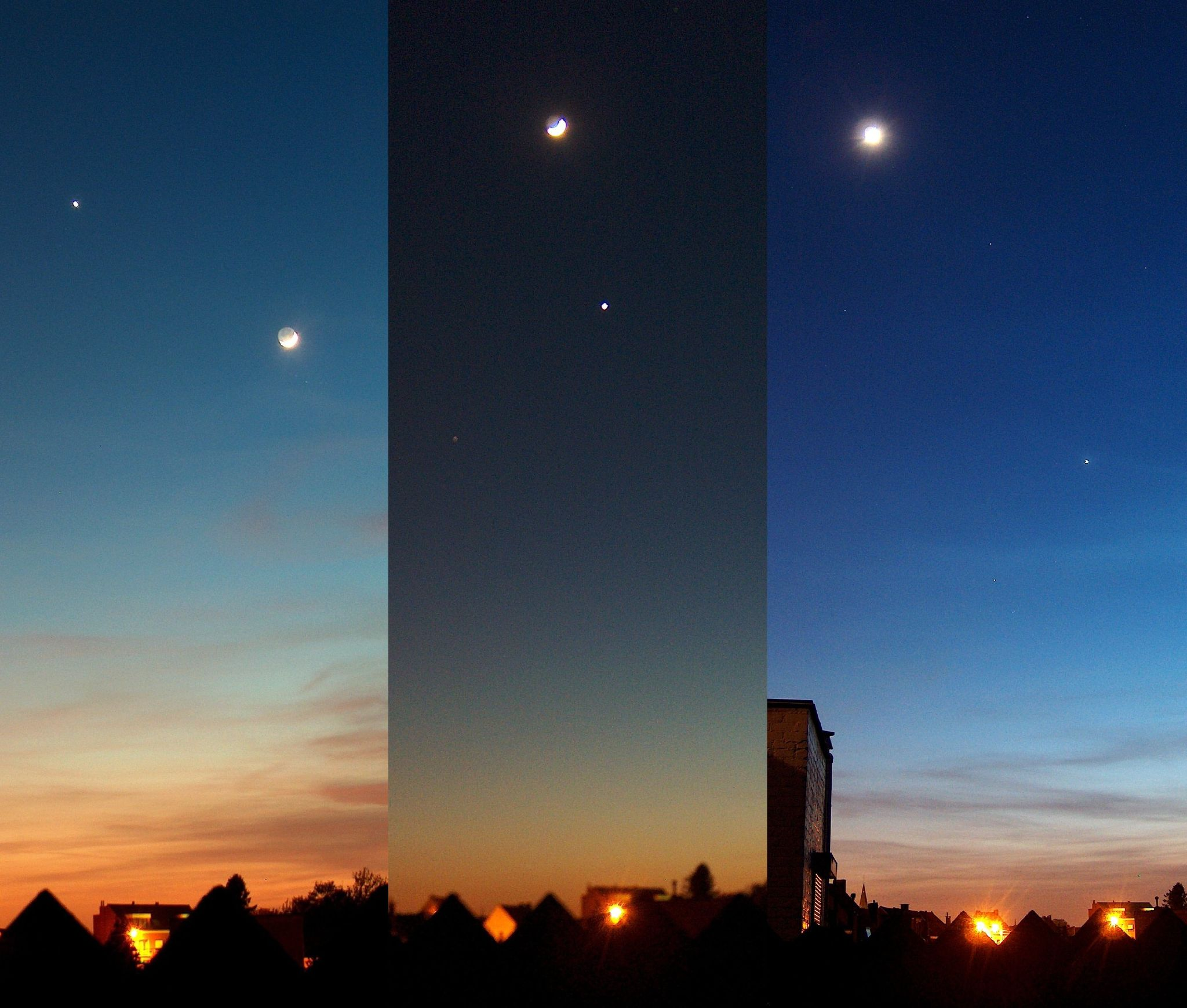
The Moon and Venus in the evening sky on three consecutive days. The centre image shows an appulse between the two objects.

Appulse is the least apparent distance between one celestial object and another, as seen from a third body during a given period. Appulse is seen in the apparent motion typical of two planets together in the sky, or of the Moon to a star or planet while the Moon orbits Earth, as seen from Earth. An appulse is an apparent phenomenon caused by perspective only; the two objects involved are not necessarily near in physical space.

An appulse is related to a conjunction, but the definitions differ in detail. While an appulse occurs when the apparent separation between two bodies is at its minimum, a conjunction occurs at the moment when the two bodies have the same right ascension or ecliptic longitude. In general, the precise time of an appulse will be different from that of a conjunction.

Objects which exhibit retrograde motion (such as planets) occasionally display an appulse event without an associated conjunction event. In these cases, the two objects appear to approach each other, but turn away before reaching a momentary coincidence of right ascension.

When the celestial bodies appear so close together that one actually passes in front of the other, the event is classified as a transit, occultation, or eclipse, and not an appulse.

Appulses are naked-eye events for general observers when involving bright planets and the Moon. They facilitate finding faint objects when such objects are involved. Very close appulse events provide an opportunity to witness two objects together in the same telescopic field of view, which is an appealing curiosity in amateur telescopy, e.g. Jupiter-Saturn appulse of December 13, 2020.

== See also ==
- Opposition (astronomy)
- Syzygy (astronomy)
