= Boss General Catalogue =

Astronomical catalogue

Boss General Catalogue (GC, sometimes General Catalogue) is an astronomical catalogue containing 33,342 stars. It was compiled by Benjamin Boss (who lived from 1880 to 1970) and published in the United States in 1936. Its original name was General Catalogue of 33,342 Stars and it superseded the previous Preliminary General Catalogue of 6,188 Stars for the Epoch 1900 published in 1910 by Benjamin's father Lewis Boss.

== Preliminary General Catalogue of 6,188 Stars for the Epoch 1900 ==
This book was the predecessor of the Boss General Catalogue and was written by Lewis Boss, Benjamin Boss's father in 1910. It was a list of the thought to be proper motion of stars. As per the name, Lewis Boss's catalogue intended to have a successor, the role of which was taken by the Boss General Catalogue. Unlike the Preliminary General Catalogue of 6,188 Stars for the Epoch 1900 which only noted the proper motion of stars, the Boss General Catalogue also lists the magnitude and spectral type of the catalogued stars. It was also much more thorough and complete; it included all stars brighter than magnitude seven (and some below that as well).
