= Dudley Observatory =

Observatory in New York state, US

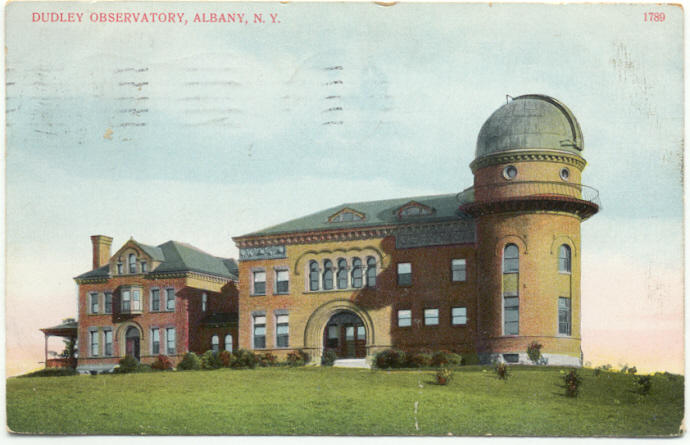
- The second Dudley Observatory building, shown on a postcard (c. 1911)
- Named after: Charles E. Dudley
- Observatory code: 296
- Location: Loudonville, New York
- Coordinates: 42°43′10″N 73°45′05″W
- Website: dudleyobservatory.org
- Related media on Commons

Dudley Observatory is an astronomical education non-profit located since 2019 in Loudonville, New York and is the oldest non-academic institution of astronomical research in America. It was formerly located in Albany, New York (1856–1973) and Schenectady (1973–2019) and was once a working observatory.

== History ==
The Observatory was chartered on February 11, 1852, by the New York State Senate, and by the New York State Assembly on April 3, 1852. It was named for Charles E. Dudley of Albany, a former United States Senator and member of the Albany Regency. Dudley lived in New York State, died in 1841, and his widow Blandina Bleeker Dudley endowed the Dudley Observatory after his death.

Dudley Observatory has operated from at least six separate sites since its founding.

=== Goat Hill (1856–1893) ===
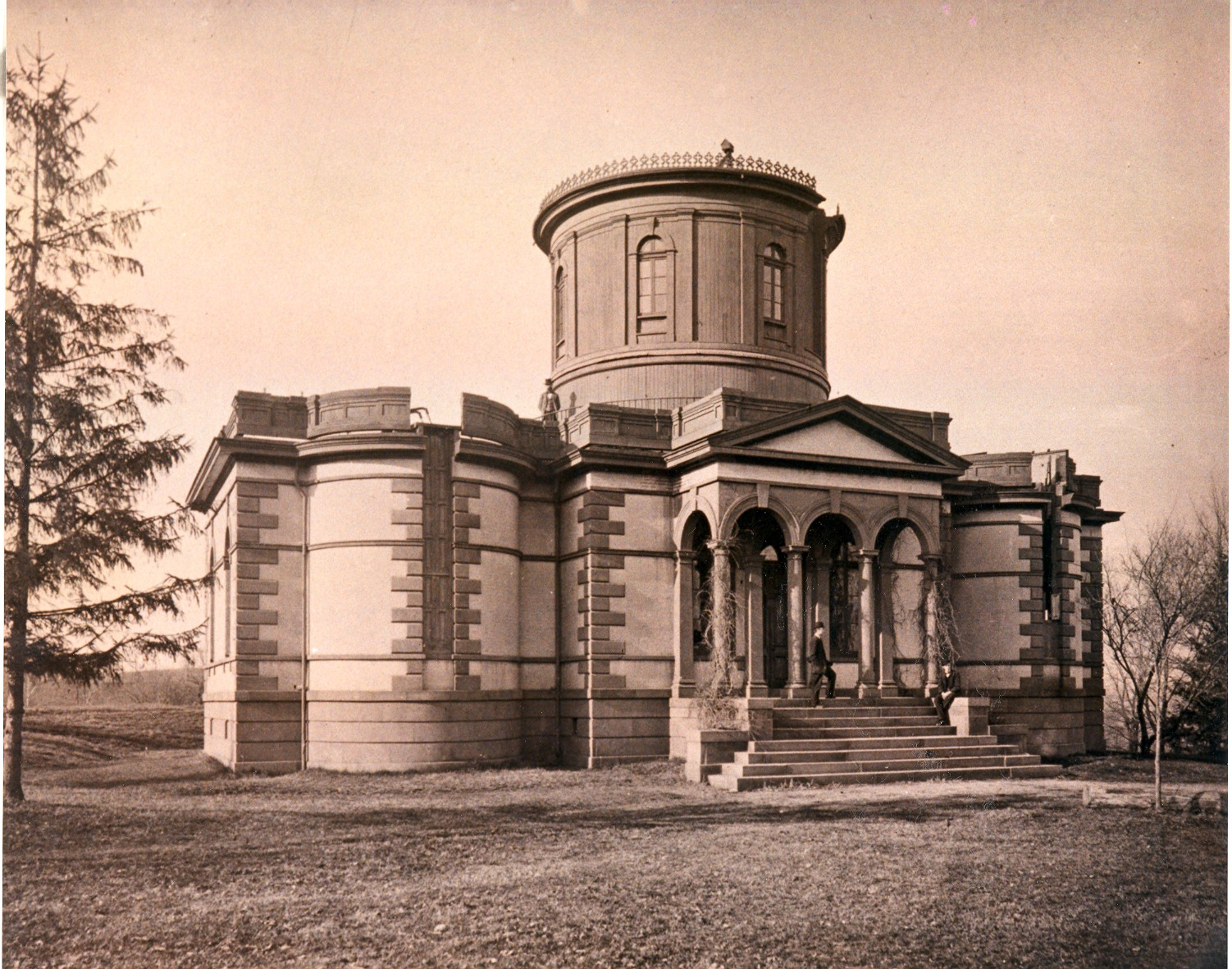
The first building of the observatory in Albany (c.1880)

The first location of the observatory was on a rise to the north-east of downtown Albany that was locally known as "Goat Hill". Today, that location is the approximate location of Arbor Hill Elementary School.

Construction began in 1852 and the building was dedicated on August 28, 1856, prior to its completion, with Edward Everett, former President of Harvard University and United States Secretary of State delivering the keynote oration.

Dudley was one of the original founding institutions comprising Union University when it was founded on April 10, 1873, by an act of the New York State Legislature.

=== South Lake Avenue (1894–1963) ===
By the 1890s, railroad traffic around the original building had grown to the point where the vibrations were disrupting the astronomical instruments. The original building was sold to the city of Albany, and new property was purchased on the grounds of the Albany Alms-House.

After World War II, Dudley began a transition from astronomical observation to research for the space race. Consequently, the second observatory was sold to Albany Medical Center in 1963. The building burned down in 1970 and was replaced by the Capital District Psychiatric Center.

=== Lewis Boss and Benjamin Boss Laboratory (1969–1976) ===
After the sale of the second observatory, an office building was purchased at 100 Fuller Road, near the University at Albany. This phase lasted until the end of the space race, when funding from NASA dried up. The Fuller Road office was rented to the University in 1976.

=== Schenectady (1977–2019) ===
After briefly being located in a strip mall in Latham, New York, the observatory donated its rare book collection to the Union College Library. From there it moved to a house on Union Avenue in 1977, before moving to the Schaffer Heights Senior Apartments building at 107 Nott Terrace in Schenectady, remaining in the latter location until 2015. In 2008, they refurbished their circa 1893 Pruyn telescope.

=== Museum of Innovation and Science (2015–2019) ===
Recently, the observatory has evolved from a research facility to an educational foundation. In 2015 in moved to the Museum of Innovation and Science in Schenectady. In 2018, ground was broken for an observatory located on the grounds of the museum which would have marked the first time Dudley would serve as a working observatory in almost 40 years.

=== Roger Bacon Hall, Siena University, Loudonville (2019–present) ===
In 2019, the Dudley Observatory moved to the grounds of Siena University in Loudonville, New York. At the same time, the archival collection was donated to the New York State Archives, which had the resources to catalog and preserve the Observatory's documents. A collection of scientific hardware, including a Brashear refracting telescope and equatorial mount, were donated to the New York State Museum in Albany. The Dudley Observatory maintains a collection of rare books including first editions by Galileo and Copernicus.

== Directors ==
1. Benjamin Apthorp Gould (1855–1859)
2. Ormsby MacKnight Mitchel (1859–1861)
3. George Washington Hough (1862–1874)
4. Lewis Boss (1876–1912)
5. Benjamin Boss (1912–1956)
6. Curtis Hemenway (1957–1977)
7. Ralph Alpher (1987–2004)
8. Colleen Gino (2004)
9. Margaret Schwab (2006–2012)
10. Elissa Kane (2012–2015)
11. Melanie Evans (2020–Present)

== See also ==
- Henry Fitz
- List of astronomical observatories
