= Lewis Boss =

American astronomer (1846–1912)

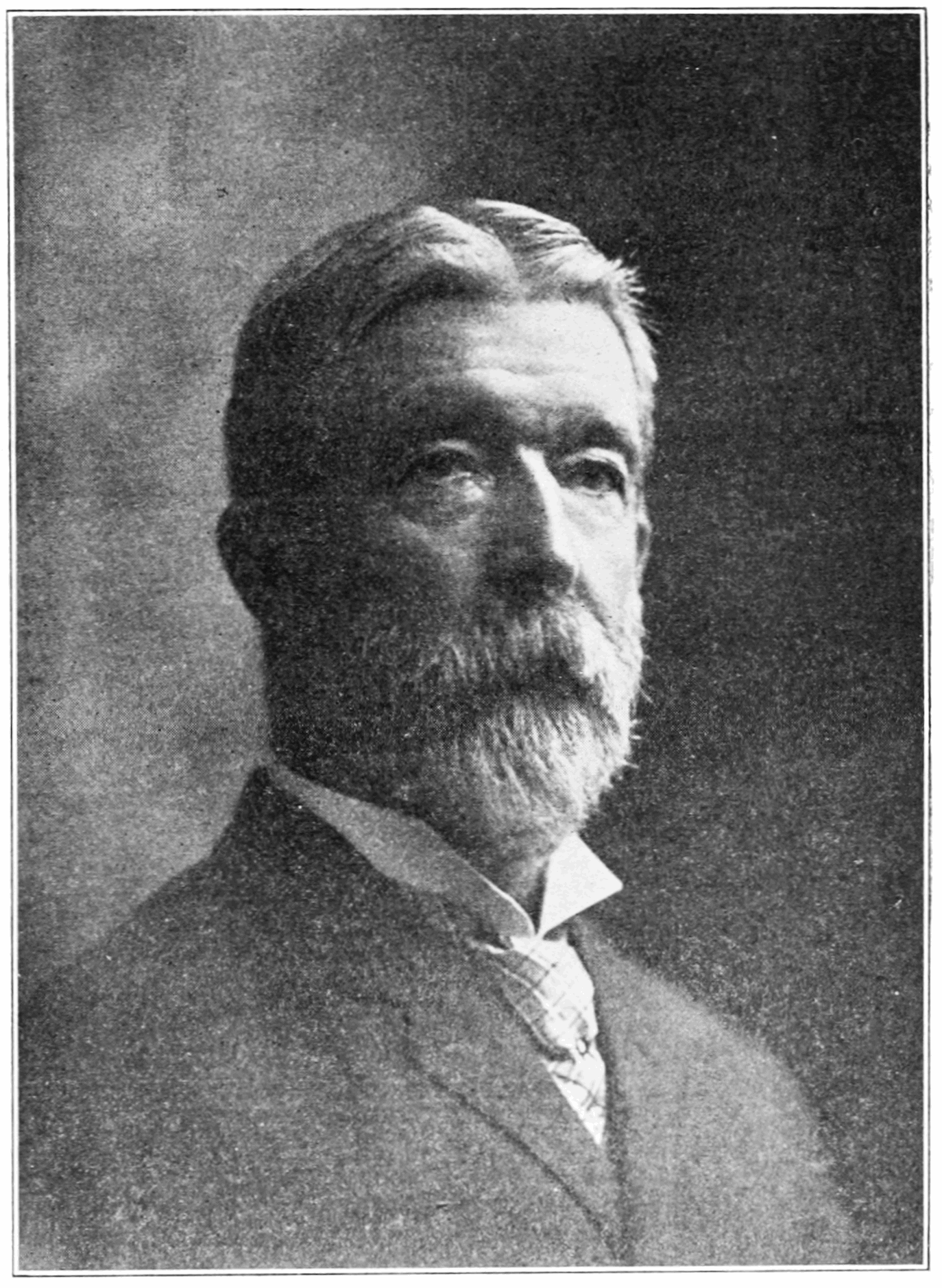
- Born: 26 October 1846; Providence, Rhode Island
- Died: 5 October 1912 (aged 65); Albany, New York
- Education: Dartmouth College
- Known for: compilation Hyades star cluster
- Spouse: Helen M. Hutchinson Boss
- Children: Benjamin Boss
- Parent(s): Samuel P. Boss; Lucinda (Joslin) Boss
- Awards: Gold Medal of the Royal Astronomical Society; Lalande Prize (1911)
- Scientific career
- Fields: Astronomy
- Workplaces: Dudley Observatory

Lewis Boss (26 October 1846 – 5 October 1912) was an American astronomer. He served as the director of the Dudley Observatory in Schenectady, New York.

== Early life ==
Boss was born in Providence, Rhode Island to Samuel P. and Lucinda (née Joslin) Boss, and attended secondary school at the Lapham Institute in North Scituate and the New Hampton Institution in New Hampshire. In 1870, he graduated from Dartmouth College, then went to work as a clerk for the U.S. Government.

== Career ==
He served as an assistant astronomer for a government expedition to survey the U.S-Canada–United States border. In 1876 he became the directory of the Dudley Observatory in Schenectady, New York.

Boss was known for his work in astronomy, particularly for cataloguing the positions and proper motions of stars. He also led an expedition to Chile in 1882 to observe the transit of Venus, and catalogued information concerning cometary orbits. He was elected to the United States National Academy of Sciences in 1889. His most significant discovery was the calculation of the convergent point of the Hyades star cluster. He was awarded the Gold Medal of the Royal Astronomical Society in 1905.

He became editor of the Astronomical Journal in 1909, and the following year published Preliminary General Catalogue of 6188 Stars for the Epoch 1900, a compilation of the proper motions of stars. He was elected to both the American Academy of Arts and Sciences and the American Philosophical Society in 1911. Following his death, responsibility for the Astronomical Journal passed to his son, Benjamin Boss. Benjamin continued to edit the journal until 1941 and also expanded his father's star catalogue, publishing the Boss General Catalogue in 1936.

== Death and legacy ==
Boss died on October 5. 1912 in Albany, New York. The Moon crater Boss is named in his honor.

== Family life ==
Boss married Helen M. Hutchinson on December 30, 1871. Their son Benjamin Boss was also a noted astronomer.

== See also ==
- Boss General Catalogue

== Sources ==
- Much of this article was based on the Dudley Observatory history of Lewis Boss.
