= The Astronomical Journal =

- Discipline: Astronomy
- Language: English

Publication details
- History: 1849–present
- Publisher: IOP Publishing for the American Astronomical Society (United States)
- Frequency: Monthly
- Open access: Gold open access
- Impact factor: 5.1 (2023)

Standard abbreviations
- ISO 4: Astron. J.

Indexing
- CODEN: ANJOAA
- ISSN: 0004-6256 (print); 1538-3881 (web)
- LCCN: sf78000620
- OCLC no.: 194559707

Links
- Journal homepage

The Astronomical Journal (often abbreviated AJ in scientific papers and references) is a peer-reviewed monthly scientific journal owned by the American Astronomical Society (AAS) and currently published by IOP Publishing. It is one of the premier journals for astronomy in the world.

Until 2008, the journal was published by the University of Chicago Press on behalf of the AAS. The reasons for the change to the IOP were given by the society as the desire of the University of Chicago Press to revise its financial arrangement and their plans to change from the particular software that had been developed in-house. The other two publications of the society, the Astrophysical Journal and its supplement series, followed in January 2009.

The journal was established in 1849 by Benjamin A. Gould. It ceased publication in 1861 due to the American Civil War, but resumed in 1885. Between 1909 and 1941 the journal was edited in Albany, New York. In 1941, editor Benjamin Boss arranged to transfer responsibility for the journal to the AAS.

The first electronic edition of The Astronomical Journal was published in January, 1998. With the July, 2006 issue, The Astronomical Journal began e-first publication, an electronic version of the journal released independently of the hardcopy issues.

As of 2016, all of the scientific AAS journals were placed under a single editor-in-chief. On January 1, 2022, the AAS Journals, including AJ, transitioned to Gold open access model, with all new papers released under a Creative Commons Attribution license and access restrictions and subscription charges removed from previously published papers.

== Editors ==
- 2016–present Ethan Vishniac
- 2005–2015 John Gallagher III
- 1984–2004 Paul W. Hodge
- 1980–1983 Norman H. Baker
- 1975–1979 Norman H. Baker and Leon B. Lucy
- 1967–1974 Lodewijk Woltjer (with Baker and Lucy for later volumes)
- 1966–1967 Gerald Maurice Clemence
- 1965–1966: Dirk Brouwer and Gerald Maurice Clemence
- 1963–1965: Dirk Brouwer
- 1959–1963: Dirk Brouwer and Harlan James Smith
- 1941–1959: Dirk Brouwer
- 1912–1941: Benjamin Boss
- 1909–1912: Lewis Boss
- 1896–1909: Seth Carlo Chandler
- 1885–1896: Benjamin A. Gould, Jr.
- 1849–1861: Benjamin A. Gould, Jr.

== See also ==
- The Astronomical Almanac
- The Astrophysical Journal
