= Elongation (astronomy) =

In astronomy, angular separation between the Sun and a planet

This diagram shows various possible elongations (ε), each of which is the angular distance between a planet and the Sun from Earth's perspective.

In astronomy, a planet's elongation is the angular separation between the Sun and the planet, with Earth as the reference point.

The greatest elongation is the maximum angular separation. Astronomical tables and websites, such as Heavens-Above, forecast when and where the planets reach their next maximum elongations.

Sometimes elongation may instead refer to the angular distance of the Moon relative Earth or the natural satellite of another planet from its central planet, for instance the angular distance of Io from Jupiter.

A quadrature occurs when the position of a body (moon or planet) is such that its elongation is 90° or 270°; i.e. the body-earth-sun angle is 90°.

== Of inferior planets ==
The greatest elongation of a given inferior planet occurs when this planet's position, in its orbital path around the Sun, is at tangent to the observer on Earth. Since an inferior planet is well within the area of Earth's orbit around the Sun, observation of its elongation should not pose that much a challenge (compared to deep-sky objects, for example). When a planet is at its greatest elongation, it appears farthest from the Sun as viewed from Earth, so its apparition is also best at that point.

When an inferior planet is visible after sunset, it is near its greatest eastern elongation. When an inferior planet is visible before sunrise, it is near its greatest western elongation. The angle of the maximum elongation (east or west) for Mercury is between 18° and 28°, while that for Venus is between 45° and 47°. These values vary because the planetary orbits are elliptical rather than perfectly circular. Another factor contributing to this inconsistency is orbital inclination, in which each planet's orbital plane is slightly tilted relative to a reference plane, like the ecliptic and invariable planes.

=== Greatest elongation period ===
Greatest elongations of a planet happen periodically, with a greatest eastern elongation followed by a greatest western elongation, and vice versa. The period depends on the relative angular velocity of Earth and the planet, as seen from the Sun. The time it takes to complete this period is the synodic period of the planet.

Let T be the period (for example the time between two greatest eastern elongations), ω be the relative angular velocity, ω_{e} Earth's angular velocity and ω_{p} the planet's angular velocity. Then

$$T = {2\pi\over \omega} = {2\pi\over \omega_\mathrm{p} - \omega_\mathrm{e}} = {2\pi\over {2\pi\over T_\mathrm{p}} - {2\pi\over T_\mathrm{e}}} = {1\over {{1\over T_\mathrm{p}} - {1\over T_\mathrm{e} }}}
= {T_\mathrm{e} \over {T_\mathrm{e} \over T_\mathrm{p}} - 1}$$

where T_{e} and T_{p} are Earth's and the planet's years (i.e. periods of revolution around the Sun, called sidereal periods).

For example, Venus's year (sidereal period) is 225 days, and Earth's is 365 days. Thus Venus's synodic period, which gives the time between every two eastern greatest elongations, is 584 days; this also applies to the western counterparts.

These values are approximate, because (as mentioned above) the planets do not have perfectly circular, coplanar orbits. When a planet is closer to the Sun it moves faster than when it is further away, so exact determination of the date and time of greatest elongation requires a much more complicated analysis of orbital mechanics.

== Of superior planets ==
Superior planets, dwarf planets and asteroids undergo a different cycle. After conjunction, such an object's elongation continues to increase until it approaches a maximum value larger than 90° (impossible with inferior planets) which is known as opposition and can also be examined as a heliocentric conjunction with Earth. This is archetypally very near 180°. As seen by an observer on the superior planet at opposition, the Earth appears at conjunction with the Sun. Technically, the point of opposition can be different from the time and point of maximum elongation. Opposition is defined as the moment when the apparent ecliptic longitude of any such object versus the Sun (seen from earth) differs by (is) 180°; it thus ignores how much the object differs from the plane of the Earth's orbit. For example, Pluto, whose orbit is highly inclined to the essentially matching plane of the planets, has maximum elongation much less than 180° at opposition. The six-word term "maximum apparent elongation from the sun" provides a fuller definition of elongation.

All superior planets are most conspicuous at their oppositions because they are near, or at, their closest to Earth and are also above the horizon all night. The variation in magnitude caused by changes in elongation are greater the closer the planet's orbit is to the Earth's. Mars' magnitude in particular changes with elongation: it can be as low as +1.8 when in conjunction near aphelion but at a rare favourable opposition it is as high as −2.9, which translates to seventy-five times brighter than its minimum brightness. As one moves further out, the difference in magnitude that correlates to the difference in elongation gradually falls. At opposition, the brightness of Jupiter from Earth ranges 3.3-fold; whereas that of Uranus – the most distant Solar System body visible to the naked eye – ranges by 1.7 times.

Since asteroids travel in an orbit not much larger than the Earth's, their magnitude can vary greatly depending on elongation. More than a dozen objects in the asteroid belt can be seen with 10×50 binoculars at an average opposition, but of these only Ceres and Vesta are always above the binocular limit of +9.5 when the objects at their worst points in their orbital opposition (smallest elongations).

== Of moons of other planets ==
Sometimes elongation may instead refer to the angular distance of a moon of another planet from its central planet, for instance the angular distance of Io from Jupiter. Here we can also talk about greatest eastern elongation and greatest western elongation. In the case of the moons of Uranus, studies often deal with greatest northern elongation and greatest southern elongation instead, due to the very high inclination of Uranus' axis of rotation.

== See also ==
- Aspects of Venus for greatest elongations of Venus
- Conjunction (astronomy)
