= Inferior and superior planets =

Geocentric cosmology of Claudius Ptolemy

In the Solar System, a planet is said to be inferior or interior with respect to another planet if its orbit lies inside the other planet's orbit around the Sun. In this situation, the latter planet is said to be superior to the former. In the reference frame of the Earth, where the terms were originally used, the inferior planets are Mercury and Venus, while the superior planets are Mars, Jupiter, Saturn, Uranus and Neptune. Dwarf planets like Ceres or Pluto and most asteroids are 'superior' in the sense that they almost all orbit outside the orbit of Earth.

== History ==
These terms were originally used in the geocentric cosmology of Claudius Ptolemy to differentiate as inferior those planets (Mercury and Venus) whose epicycle remained co-linear with the Earth and Sun, and as superior those planets (Mars, Jupiter, and Saturn) that did not.

In the 16th century, the terms were modified by Copernicus, who rejected Ptolemy's geocentric model, to distinguish a planet's orbit's size in relation to the Earth's.

== Planets in each category ==
When Earth is stated or assumed to be the reference point:

- "Inferior planet" refers to Mercury and Venus, which are closer to the Sun than Earth is.
- "Superior planet" refers to Mars, Jupiter, Saturn, Uranus, and Neptune (the latter two added later), which are further from the Sun than Earth is.

The terms are sometimes used more generally; for example, Earth is an inferior planet relative to Mars.

== Other planetary terms ==
Inferior planet now seems to be the preferred term for astronomers. Inferior/interior and superior are different from the terms inner planet and outer planet, which designate those planets that lie inside the asteroid belt and those that lie outside it, respectively. Inferior planet is also different from minor planet or dwarf planet. Superior planet is also different from gas giant.
