= G12.82-0.02 =

Supernova remnant in the constellation Sagittarius

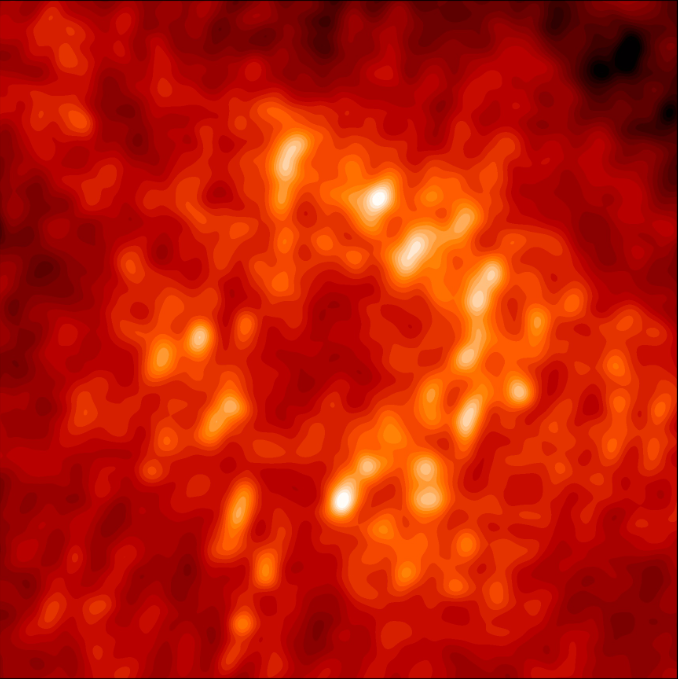
- Radio image of G12.82-0.02
- Event type: Supernova
- SNII
- Date: c. 1708-1720 (discovered in 2005)
- Constellation: Sagittarius
- Right ascension: 18^{h} 13^{m} 36.0^{s}
- Declination: −17° 49′ 00″
- Epoch: J2000
- Distance: c. 14,700 ly (4,500 pc)
- Host: Milky Way
- Progenitor: Red supergiant
- Other designations: G12.82-0.02, SNR G012.8-00.0, GAL 012.82-00.02
- Preceded by: Cassiopeia A
- Followed by: G1.9+0.3

G12.82-0.02 also known as SNR G012.8-0.00, is a supernova remnant (SNR) and pulsar wind nebula (PWN) in the constellation of Sagittarius. The supernova remnant is roughly 15,000 light years (or 4,500 parsecs) away, based on its likely association with the star-forming region designated W33. The supernova remnant is located in the Galactic Plane, and a gas cloud was found near it with a molecular mass of 2.5×10^{5} M_{☉}. The supernova remnant was discovered in 2005 as the host of the X-ray source and pulsar, HESS J1813-178.

== Supernova ==
G12.82-0.02 is the second youngest supernova remnant in the Milky Way only behind G1.9+0.3, which exploded in the late 19th century. The supernova remnant is estimated to be extremely young because of its small size. The supernova remnant has a diameter of 12.8 light years (or 4 parsecs) across, based on an angular diameter of 3 arcmin. The supernova exploded between 1708 and 1720, preceded by Cassiopeia A, and was followed by G1.9+0.3. The supernova was classified as a core collapse supernova (abbreviated as SNII). The supernova could not have been observed from Earth due to it being obscured by dust. The progenitor star was a 20 to 30 M_{☉} red supergiant, which is usual for this type of supernova.

== Central neutron star ==
The central neutron star of G12.82-0.02, referred to as PSR J1813-1749 is a millisecond pulsar. PSR J1813-1749 has a rotational period of 44.7 milliseconds, and is extremely energetic. The pulsar has one of the highest velocities of any neutron star in the Milky Way, with a velocity of 900 to 1,600 km/s. It has a very strong magnetic field with a power of 2.7×10^{12} gauss. The pulsar has a luminosity of 0.832 L_{☉} and an effective temperature of 3,481,000 kelvin, corresponding to a diameter of 3.49 kilometers. The pulsar was originally formed in a nearby star cluster with a mass of 2,000 to 6,500 M_{☉}.

== See also ==
- G1.9+0.3, another recently formed supernova remnant.
- Cassiopeia A, another core-collapse supernova in the Milky Way.
