= Kepler star =

Kepler star may refer to:

- Kepler Object of Interest, a star observed by the Kepler spacecraft which is suspected of hosting one or more transiting planets
- Kepler's Supernova, a supernova that occurred in the Milky Way, observed by the naked eye in 1604
- Small or great stellated dodecahedron, geometric solids; see Kepler–Poinsot polyhedron
