= Great conjunction =

Conjunction of the planets Jupiter and Saturn

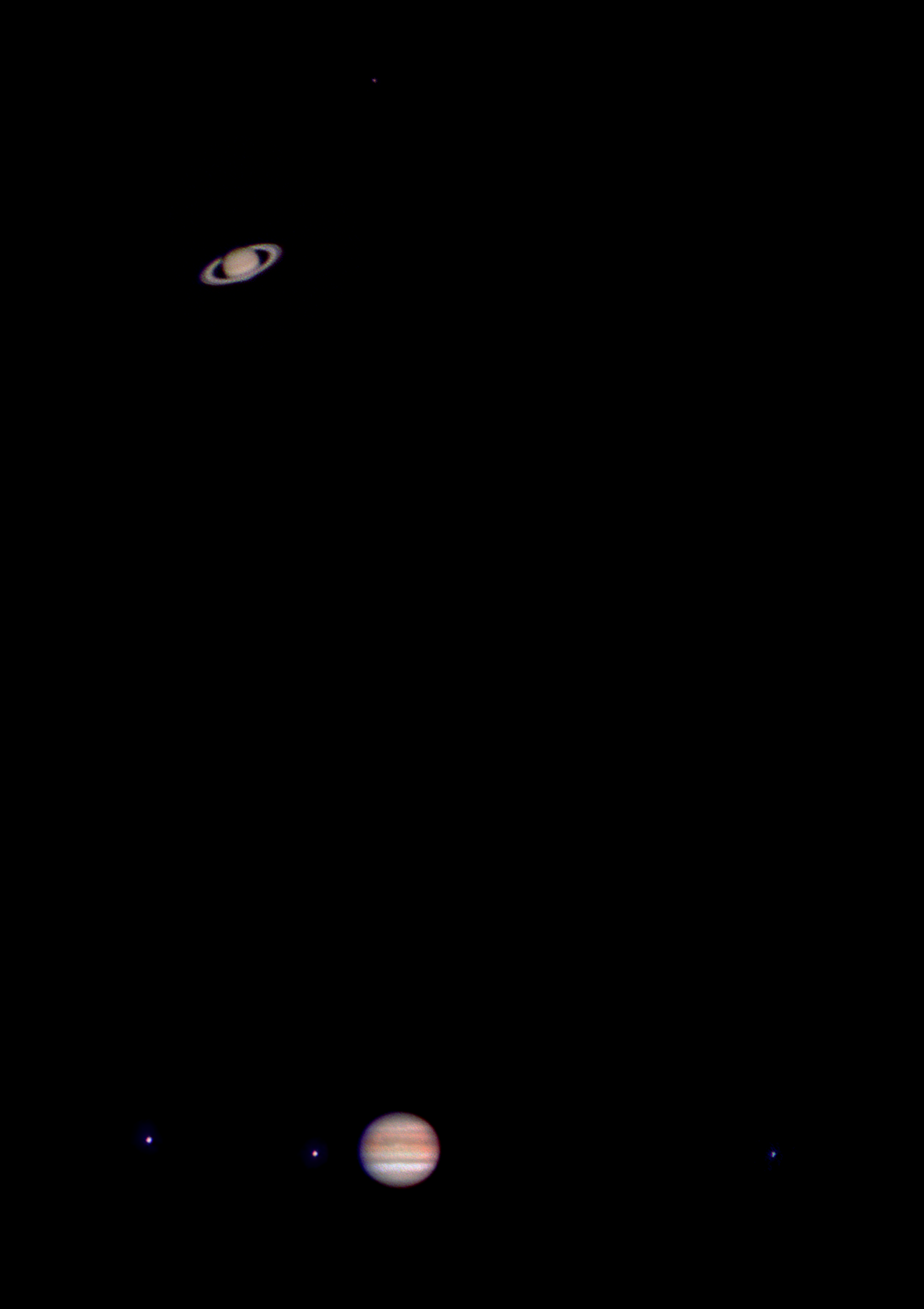
Stacked photograph of the great conjunction of 2020 four hours before closest approach, with Jupiter 6–7 arcminutes below Saturn. The moons Io, Ganymede, Europa, and Titan are visible.

A great conjunction is a conjunction of the planets Jupiter and Saturn, when the two planets appear closest together in the sky. Great conjunctions occur approximately every 20 years when Jupiter "overtakes" Saturn in its orbit. They are named "great" for being by far the rarest of the conjunctions between naked-eye planets (i.e. excluding Uranus, Neptune, and the dwarf planets).

The spacing between the planets varies from conjunction to conjunction with most events being 0.5 to 1.3 degrees (30 to 78 arcminutes, or 1 to 2.5 times the width of a full moon). Very close conjunctions happen much less frequently (though the maximum of 1.3° is still close by inner planet standards): separations of less than 10 arcminutes have only happened four times since 1200, most recently in 2020.

== In history ==
Great conjunctions attracted considerable attention in the past as omens. During the late Middle Ages and Renaissance they were a topic broached by the pre-scientific and transitional astronomer-astrologers of the period up to the time of Tycho Brahe and Johannes Kepler, by scholastic thinkers such as Roger Bacon and Pierre d'Ailly, and they are mentioned in popular and literary works by authors such as Dante, Lope de Vega, and Shakespeare. This interest is traced back in Europe to translations of Arabic texts, especially Albumasar's book on conjunctions.

Clusterings of several planets were considered even more significant. The Chinese apparently remembered the clustering of all five planets in 1953 BC, and noted the clustering of all but Venus in 1576 BC and of all five in 1059 BC. These were connected in Chinese thought to the founding of the first three historical dynasties, the Xia dynasty, the Shang dynasty, and the Zhou dynasty. The intervals involved, of 377.8 years (19 great conjunction intervals) and 516.4 years (26 great conjunction intervals) bring Mars back to approximately the same position. Further repeats of the 516-year period lead to the clustering in AD 1524, considered ominous in Europe at the time of the Radical Reformation, and the upcoming clustering of September 2040, which will involve all five planets again, in a longitude span of less than 7°.

== Celestial mechanics ==
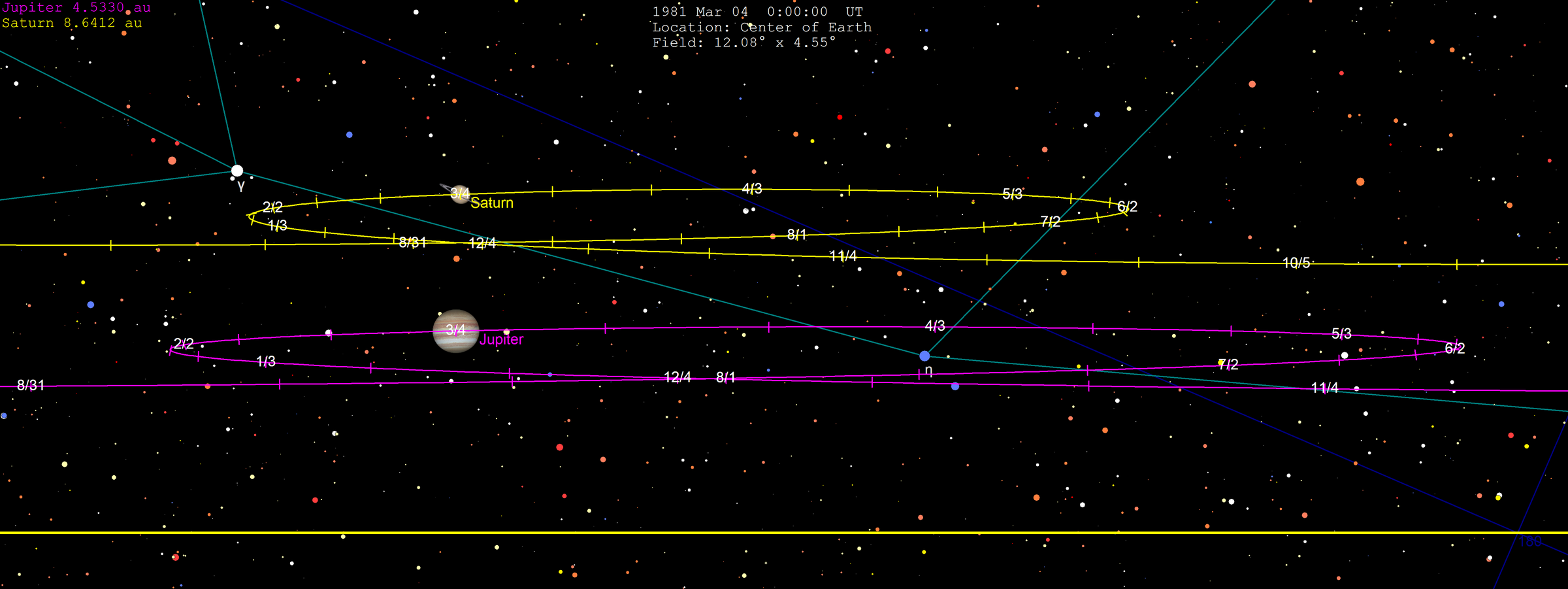
Diagram showing the movements of Jupiter and Saturn during the 1980–81 triple conjunction

On average, great conjunction seasons occur once every 19.859 Julian years (each of which is 365.25 days). This number can be calculated by the synodic period formula
$$\frac{1}{\left ( \frac{1}{J} - \frac{1}{S} \right )} \approx 7253.46 \; \mathrm{days} \displaystyle,$$
in which J and S are the orbital periods of Jupiter (4332.59 days) and Saturn (10759.22 days), respectively. This is about 52 days less than 20 years, but in practice, Earth's orbit size can cause great conjunctions to reoccur anytime between 18 years 10 months and 20 years 8 months after the previous one. (See table below.) Since the equivalent periods of other naked-eye planet pairs are all under 900 days, this makes great conjunctions the rarest.

Occasionally there is more than one great conjunction in a season, which happens whenever they're close enough to opposition: this is called a triple conjunction (which is not exclusive to great conjunctions). In this scenario, Jupiter and Saturn will occupy the same right ascension on three occasions or same ecliptic longitude on three occasions, depending on which definition of "conjunction" one uses (this is due to apparent retrograde motion and happens within months). The most recent triple conjunction occurred in 1980–81 and the next will be in 2238–39.

The most recent great conjunction occurred on 21 December 2020, and the next will occur on 4 November 2040. During the 2020 great conjunction, the two planets were separated in the sky by 6 arcminutes at their closest point, which was the closest distance between the two planets since 1623. The closeness is the result of the conjunction occurring in the vicinity of one of the two longitudes where the two orbits appear to intersect when viewed from the Sun (which has a point of view similar to Earth).

Jupiter and Saturn's great conjunctions repeat every ~120°, Saturn's path relative to Jupiter in blue.	Kepler's trigon, a diagram of great conjunctions from Johannes Kepler's 1606 book De Stella Nova

Because 19.859 years is equal to 1.674 Jupiter orbits and 0.674 Saturn orbits, three of these periods come close to a whole number of revolutions. As successive great conjunctions occur nearly 120° apart, their appearances form a triangular pattern. In a series, every third conjunction returns after some 60 years to the vicinity of the first. These returns are observed to be shifted by some 8° relative to the fixed stars, so no more than four of them occur in the same zodiacal constellation. Usually the conjunctions occur in one of the following triplicities or trigons of zodiacal constellations:

1. Aries, Sagittarius, and Leo
2. Taurus, Capricorn, and Virgo
3. Gemini, Aquarius, and Libra
4. Cancer, Pisces, and Scorpius

After about 220 years the pattern shifts to the next trigon, and in about 800 or 900 years returns to the first trigon.

The three points of the triangle revolve in the same direction as the planets at the rate of approximately one-sixth of a revolution per four centuries, thus creating especially close conjunctions on an approximately four-century cycle. Currently the longitudes of close great conjunctions are about 307.4 and 127.4 degrees, in Capricornus and Cancer respectively.

In astrology, one of the four elements was ascribed to each triangular pattern. Particular importance was accorded to the occurrence of a great conjunction in a new trigon, which is bound to happen after some 240 years at most. Even greater importance was attributed to the beginning of a new cycle after all fours trigons had been visited. Medieval astrologers usually gave 960 years as the duration of the full cycle, perhaps because in some cases it took 240 years to pass from one trigon to the next. If a cycle is defined by when the conjunctions return to the same right ascension rather than to the same constellation, then because of axial precession the cycle is less than 800 years. Use of the Alphonsine tables apparently led to the use of precessing signs, and Kepler gave a value of 794 years (40 conjunctions).

Despite mathematical errors and some disagreement among astrologers about when trigons began, belief in the significance of such events generated a stream of publications that grew steadily until the end of the 16th century. As the great conjunction of 1583 was last in the water trigon it was widely supposed to herald apocalyptic changes; a papal bull against divination was issued in 1586 but as nothing significant happened by the feared event of 1603, public interest rapidly died. By the start of the next trigon, modern scientific consensus had condemned astrology as pseudoscience, and astronomers no longer perceived planetary alignments as omens. However, in the year 1962, when all five planets formed a cluster 17° wide, there was considerable concern.

Cumulative distribution of separation distance of great conjunctions between AD 1200 and AD 2400 (blue), and an approximation formula (red)

Saturn's orbit plane is inclined 2.485 degrees relative to Earth's, and Jupiter's is inclined 1.303 degrees. The ascending nodes of both planets are similar (100.6 degrees for Jupiter and 113.7 degrees for Saturn), meaning if Saturn is above or below Earth's orbital plane Jupiter usually is too. Because these nodes align so well it would be expected that no closest approach will ever be much worse than the difference between the two inclinations. Indeed, between year 1 and 3000, the maximum conjunction distances were 1.3 degrees in 1306 and 1940. Conjunctions in both years occurred when the planets were tilted most out of the plane: longitude 206 degrees (therefore above the plane) in 1306, and longitude 39 degrees (therefore below the plane) in 1940.

== List of great conjunctions (1200 to 2400) ==
The following table details great conjunctions in between 1200 and 2400. The dates are given for the conjunctions in right ascension (the dates for conjunctions in ecliptic longitude can differ by several days). Dates before 1582 are in the Julian calendar while dates after 1582 are in the Gregorian calendar.

Longitude is measured counterclockwise from the location of the First Point of Aries (the location of the March equinox) at epoch J2000. This non-rotating coordinate system doesn't move with the precession of Earth's axes, thus being suited for calculations of the locations of stars. (In astrometry latitude and longitude are based on the ecliptic which is Earth's orbit extended sunward and anti-sunward indefinitely.) The other common conjunction coordinate system is measured counterclockwise in right ascension from the First Point of Aries and is based on Earth's equator and the meridian of the equinox point both extended upwards indefinitely; ecliptic separations are usually smaller.

Distance is the angular separation between the planets in sixtieths of a degree (minutes of arc) and elongation is the angular distance from the Sun in degrees. An elongation between around −20 and +20 degrees indicates that the Sun is close enough to the conjunction to make it difficult or impossible to see, sometimes more difficult at some geographic latitudes and less difficult elsewhere. Note that the exact moment of conjunction cannot be seen everywhere as it is below the horizon or it is daytime in some places, but a place on Earth affects minimum separation less than it would if an inner planet was involved. Negative elongations indicate the planet is west of the Sun (visible in the morning sky), whereas positive elongations indicate the planet is east of the Sun (visible in the evening sky).

The great conjunction series is roughly analogous to the Saros series for solar eclipses (which are Sun–Moon conjunctions). Conjunctions in a particular series occur about 119.16 years apart. The reason it is every six conjunctions instead of every three is that 119.16 years is closer to a whole number of years than 119.16/2 = 59.58 is, so Earth will be closer to the same position in its orbit and conjunctions will appear more similar. All series will have progressions where conjunctions gradually shift from only visible before sunrise to visible throughout the night to only visible after sunset and finally back to the morning sky again. The location in the sky of each conjunction in a series should increase in longitude by 16.3 degrees on average, making one full cycle relative to the stars on average once every 2,634 years. If instead we use the convention of measuring longitude eastward from the First Point of Aries, we have to keep in mind that the equinox circulates once every c. 25,772 years, so longitudes measured that way increase slightly faster and those numbers become 17.95 degrees and 2,390 years.

A conjunction can be a member of a triple conjunction. In a triple conjunction, the series does not advance by one each event as the constellation and year is the same or close to it, this is the only time great conjunctions can be less than about 20 years apart.

Date	Longitude (degrees)	Distance (arcminutes)	Elongation (degrees)	Series	Easy to see	Triple
16 April 1206	66.8	65.3	+23.0	2	Depends on observer latitude	No
4 March 1226	313.8	2.1	−48.6	3	Yes	No
21 September 1246	209.6	62.3	+13.5	4	No	No
23 July 1265	79.9	57.3	−58.5	5	Yes	No
31 December 1285	318.0	10.6	+19.8	6	Depends on observer latitude	No
24 December 1305	220.4	71.5	−70.0	1	Yes	Yes
20 April 1306	217.8	75.5	+170.7	1	Yes	Yes
19 July 1306	215.7	78.6	+82.5	1	Yes	Yes
1 June 1325	87.2	49.2	−0.4	2	No	No
24 March 1345	328.2	21.2	−52.5	3	Yes	No
25 October 1365	226.0	72.6	−3.7	4	No	No
8 April 1385	94.4	43.2	+58.8	5	Yes	No
16 January 1405	332.1	29.3	+18.1	6	No	No
10 February 1425	235.2	70.7	+104.1	1	Yes	Yes
10 March 1425	234.4	72.4	−141.6	1	Yes	Yes
24 August 1425	230.6	76.3	+62.6	1	Yes	Yes
13 July 1444	106.9	28.5	−15.9	2	No	No
7 April 1464	342.1	38.2	−52.6	3	Yes	No
17 November 1484	240.2	68.3	−12.3	4	No	No
25 May 1504	113.4	18.7	+33.5	5	Depends on observer latitude	No
30 January 1524	345.8	46.1	+19.1	6	No	No
17 September 1544	245.1	69.2	+53.4	1	Yes	No
25 August 1563	125.3	6.8	−42.1	2	Yes	No
2 May 1583	355.9	52.9	−51.2	3	Yes	No
17 December 1603	253.8	59.0	−17.6	4	No	No
17 July 1623	131.9	5.2	+12.9	5	No	No
24 February 1643	0.1	59.3	+18.8	6	No	No
17 October 1663	254.8	59.2	+48.7	1	Yes	No
23 October 1682	143.5	15.4	−71.8	2	Yes	Yes
8 February 1683	141.1	11.6	+175.8	2	Yes	Yes
17 May 1683	138.9	15.8	+77.5	2	Yes	Yes
21 May 1702	10.8	63.4	−53.5	3	Yes	No
5 January 1723	265.1	47.7	−23.8	4	Depends on observer latitude	No
30 August 1742	150.8	27.8	−10.3	5	No	No
18 March 1762	15.6	69.4	+14.5	6	No	No
5 November 1782	271.1	44.6	+44.9	1	Yes	No
16 July 1802	157.7	39.5	+41.3	2	Yes	No
18 June 1821	27.1	72.9	−62.9	3	Yes	No
26 January 1842	281.1	32.3	−27.1	4	Depends on observer latitude	No
20 October 1861	170.2	47.4	−39.5	5	Yes	No
17 April 1881	33.0	74.5	+3.8	6	No	No
28 November 1901	285.4	26.5	+38.3	1	Yes	No
8 September 1921	177.3	58.3	+11.1	2	No	No
6 August 1940	45.2	71.4	−89.8	3	Yes	Yes
21 October 1940	41.1	74.1	−165.7	3	Yes	Yes
14 February 1941	39.9	77.4	+73.3	3	Yes	Yes
18 February 1961	295.7	13.8	−34.5	4	Depends on observer latitude	No
1 January 1981	189.8	63.7	−91.4	5	Yes	Yes
6 March 1981	188.3	63.3	−155.9	5	Yes	Yes
25 July 1981	185.3	67.6	+62.7	5	Yes	Yes
28 May 2000	52.6	68.9	−14.6	6	No	No
21 December 2020	300.3	6.1	+30.2	1	Depends on observer latitude	No
4 November 2040	197.8	72.8	−24.6	2	Depends on observer latitude	No
8 April 2060	59.6	67.5	+41.7	3	Yes	No
15 March 2080	310.8	6.0	−43.7	4	Yes	No
18 September 2100	204.1	62.5	+29.5	5	Depends on observer latitude	No
15 July 2119	+73.2	57.5	−37.8	6	Yes	No
14 January 2140	315.1	14.5	+22.7	1	Depends on observer latitude	No
20 February 2159	215.3	71.2	−50.3	2	Yes	No
28 May 2179	80.6	49.5	+16.1	3	No	No
8 April 2199	325.6	25.2	−50.0	4	Yes	No
1 November 2219	221.7	63.1	+6.8	5	No	No
6 September 2238	93.2	39.3	−67.6	6	Yes	Yes
12 January 2239	90.2	47.5	+161.3	6	Yes	Yes
22 March 2239	88.4	45.3	+89.9	6	Yes	Yes
2 February 2259	329.6	33.3	+19.6	1	Depends on observer latitude	No
5 February 2279	231.9	69.9	−80.3	2	Yes	Yes
7 May 2279	229.9	73.8	−172.6	2	Yes	Yes
31 August 2279	227.2	74.9	+73.3	2	Yes	Yes
12 July 2298	100.6	28.3	−6.0	3	No	No
26 April 2318	339.8	41.8	−51.8	4	Yes	No
1 December 2338	237.3	66.3	−7.4	5	No	No
22 May 2358	107.5	18.5	+50.7	6	Yes	No
18 February 2378	343.7	50.5	+19.4	1	No	No
2 October 2398	240.7	65.9	+58.2	2	Yes	No

Number of events 1200–2400 by closeness
Angular distance	Number of conjunctions
0 to 10 arcmin	5
10 to 20 arcmin	8
20 to 30 arcmin	7
30 to 40 arcmin	5
40 to 50 arcmin	10
50 to 60 arcmin	8
60 to 70 arcmin	16
70 to 78.6 arcmin	16
over 78.6 arcmin	0

Number of events 1200–2400 by elongation
Elongation	Number of conjunctions
−180 to −135 degrees	4
−135 to −90 degrees	1
−90 to −45 degrees	15
−45 to 0 degrees	17
0 to +45 degrees	22
+45 to +90 degrees	12
+90 to +135 degrees	1
+135 to +180 degrees	3

Number of events 1200–2400 by triplicity
Type of set	Number of conjunctions
Part of a triple conjunction	21
Single conjunction	54

== Notable great conjunctions ==
List of close great conjunctions consisting of all events under 9.95 arcminutes between AD 1 and 3000, (Note: Dates before 1582 are in the Julian calendar while dates after are in the Gregorian calendar.) plus other notable events.
Date	Ecliptic coordinates (non-rotating/star tracking)	Separation (in arcminutes)	Visibility (Note: There is always at least a small area around one or both poles that cannot see due to midnight sun or midnight twilight; this is not mentioned when the conjunction is easily visible from most of each hemisphere.)	Notes
1 May 1793 BC	153.4°	1.3	Evening	The closest conjunction between prehistoric times and the 46th century AD. Part of triple conjunction.
28 December 424 BC	322.8°	1.5	Evening, hard to see.	
6 March 372	316.6°	1.9	Morning	The closest conjunction of the first three millennia AD.
31 December 431	320.6°	6.2	Evening, hard to see.	
13 September 709	130.8°	8.3	Morning, part of a triple conjunction.	
22 July 769	137.8°	4.3	Too close to the Sun to be visible.	
11 December 1166	303.3°	2.1	Evening, hard to see.	
4 March 1226	313.8°	2.1	Morning	
25 August 1563	125.3°	6.8	Morning	
16 July 1623	131.9°	5.2	Evening, hard to see (especially from Northern Hemisphere).	
21 December 2020	300.3°	6.1	Evening, hard to see from high northern latitudes, not visible in Antarctic (poor angle, summer sun).	303+ degree heliocentric longitude close to the ideal 317 degree orbit plane intersection longitude for closeness (J2000)
15 March 2080	310.8°	6.0	Morning, hard to see from mid and high northern latitudes	
24 August 2417	119.6°	5.4	Morning, not easy to impossible to see from parts of the Southern Hemisphere and Arctic.	
6 July 2477	126.2°	6.3	Evening, easier to see in the Southern Hemisphere.	
25 December 2874	297.1°	2.3	Evening, summer sun hinders viewing in Antarctica.	
19 March 2934	307.6°	9.3	Morning	
8 March 4523	287.8°	1.0	Morning, not easy to see from high northern latitudes and the South Pole area due to a low height above the horizon and/or midnight sun or "midnight twilight".	The closest conjunction in almost 14,400 years.

Events closer than 9.95 arcmin AD 1–3000, sorted by direction
Longitude (from Earth)	Number of conjunctions
119 to 138 degrees	6
297 to 321 degrees	8
Other	0

=== 7 BC ===
A simulated view of the great conjunction of 7 BC as viewed from Jerusalem on the evening of 12 November.

When studying the great conjunction of 1603, Johannes Kepler thought that the Star of Bethlehem might have been the occurrence of a great conjunction. He calculated that a triple conjunction of Jupiter and Saturn occurred in 7 BC (−6 using astronomical year numbering);

=== 1563 ===
The astronomers from the Cracow Academy (Jan Muscenius, Stanisław Jakobejusz, Nicolaus Schadeck, Petrus Probosczowicze, and others) observed the great conjunction of 1563 to compare Alfonsine tables (based on a geocentric model) with the Prutenic Tables (based on Copernican heliocentrism). In the Prutenic Tables the astronomers found Jupiter and Saturn so close to each other that Jupiter covered Saturn (actual angular separation was 6.8 minutes on 25 August 1563). The Alfonsine tables suggested that the conjunction should be observed on another day but on the day indicated by the Alfonsine tables the angular separation was a full 141 minutes. The Cracow professors suggested following the more accurate Copernican predictions and between 1578 and 1580 Copernican heliocentrism was lectured on three times by Valentin Fontani.

This conjunction was also observed by Tycho Brahe, who noticed that the Copernican and Ptolemaic tables used to predict the conjunction were inaccurate. This led him to realise that progress in astronomy required systematic, rigorous observation, night after night, using the most accurate instruments obtainable.

=== 2020 ===
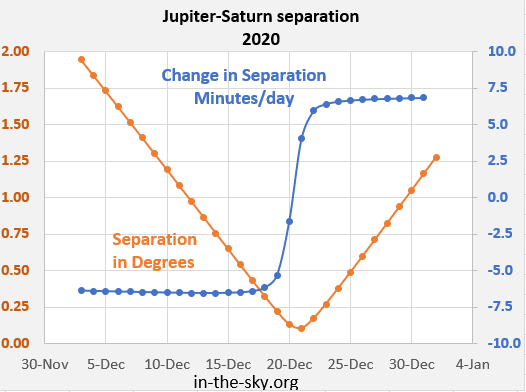
Separation of Jupiter and Saturn around the time of the 2020 great conjunction

The great conjunction of 2020 was the closest since 1623 and eighth closest of the first three millennia AD, with a minimum separation between the two planets of 6.1 arcminutes. This great conjunction was also the most easily visible close conjunction since 1226 (as the previous close conjunctions in 1563 and 1623 were closer to the Sun and therefore more difficult to see). It occurred seven weeks after the heliocentric conjunction, when Jupiter and Saturn shared the same heliocentric longitude.

The closest separation occurred on 21 December at 18:20 UTC, when Jupiter was 0.1° south of Saturn and 30° east of the Sun. This meant both planets appeared together in the field of view of most small- and medium-sized telescopes (though they were distinguishable from each other without optical aid). During the closest approach, both planets appeared to be a binary object to the naked eye. From mid-northern latitudes, the planets were visible one hour after sunset at less than 15° in altitude above the southwestern horizon in the constellation of Capricornus.

The conjunction attracted considerable media attention, with news sources calling it the "Christmas Star" due to the proximity of the date of the conjunction to Christmas, and for a great conjunction being one of the hypothesized explanations for the biblical Star of Bethlehem.

==== Gallery ====
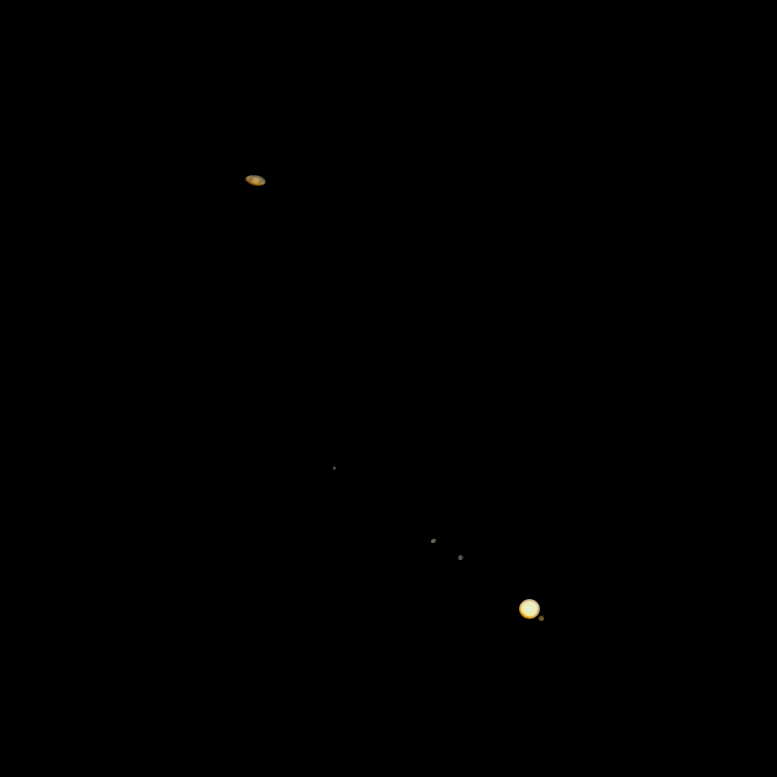
Photograph taken two days before closest approach with a separation of approximately 15 arcminutes.

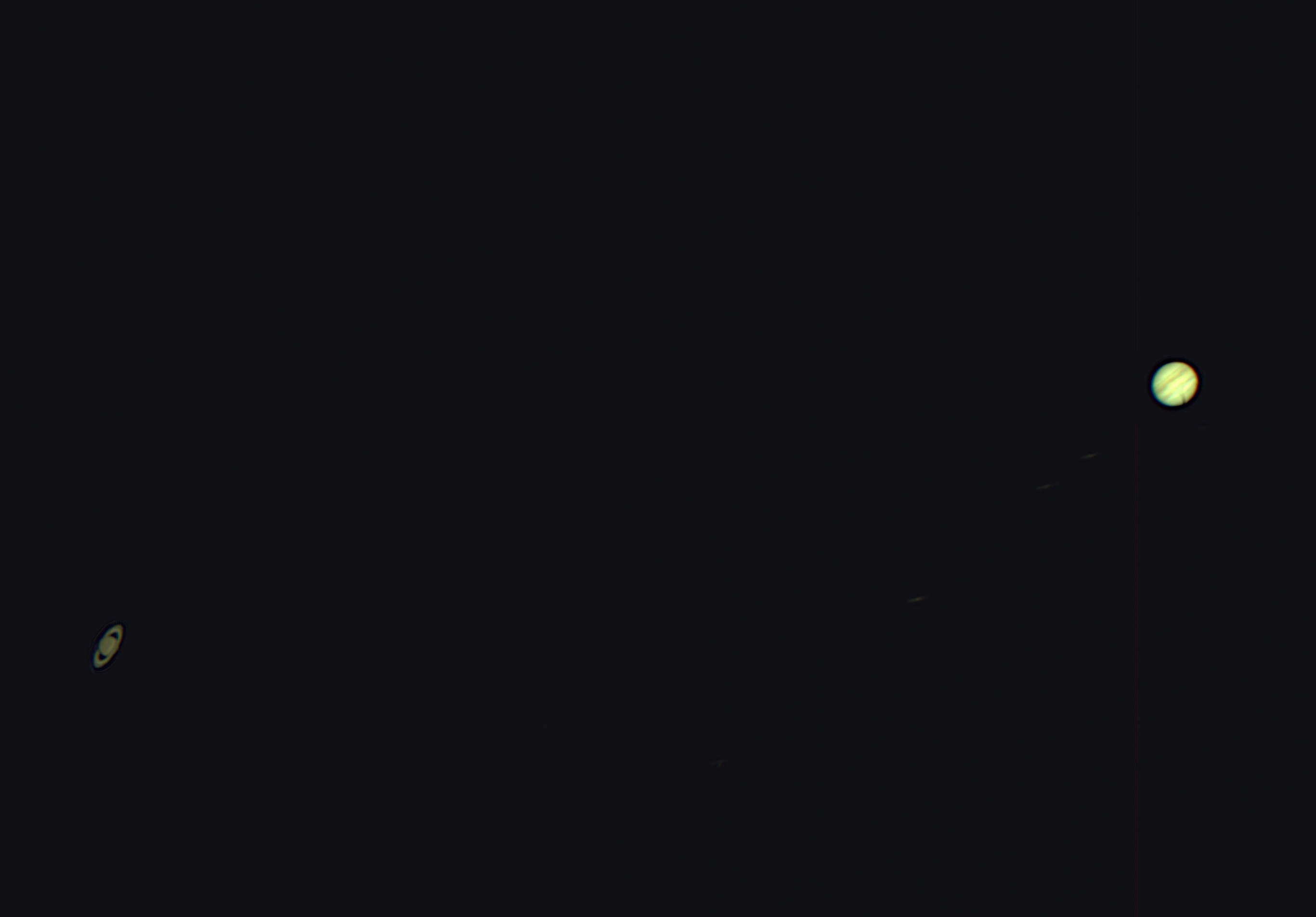
Great conjunction photographed on December 19, 2020, with a 360 mm (14 in) SCT telescope and color CCD.

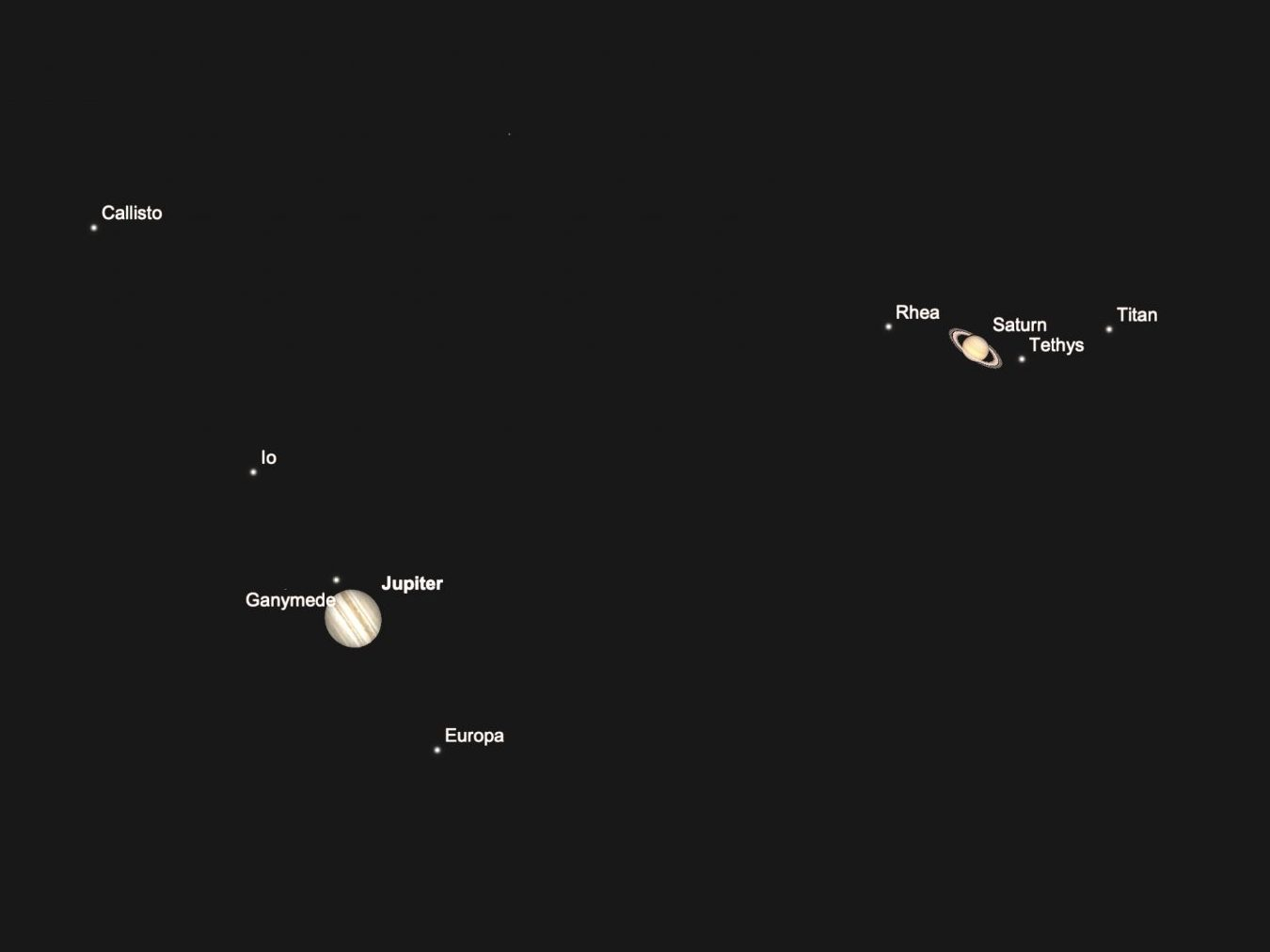
Simulated best-case scenario view through a telescope.

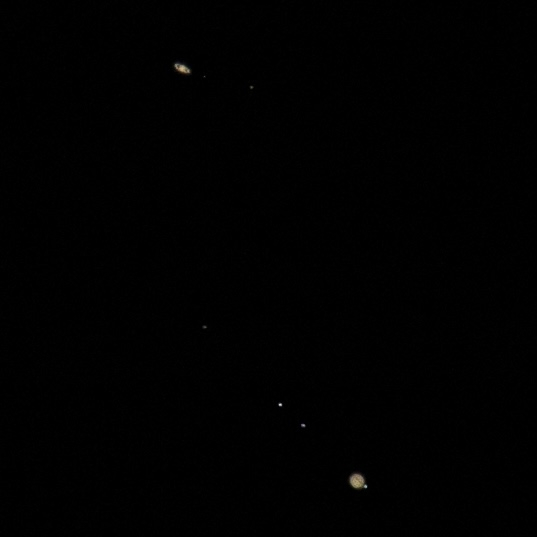
Photograph of the great conjunction of 2020 taken two days before closest approach with the four Galilean moons visible around Jupiter. (Titan can also be seen to the right of Saturn.)

December 21, 2020, Jupiter and Saturn, 130mm Bresser Messier

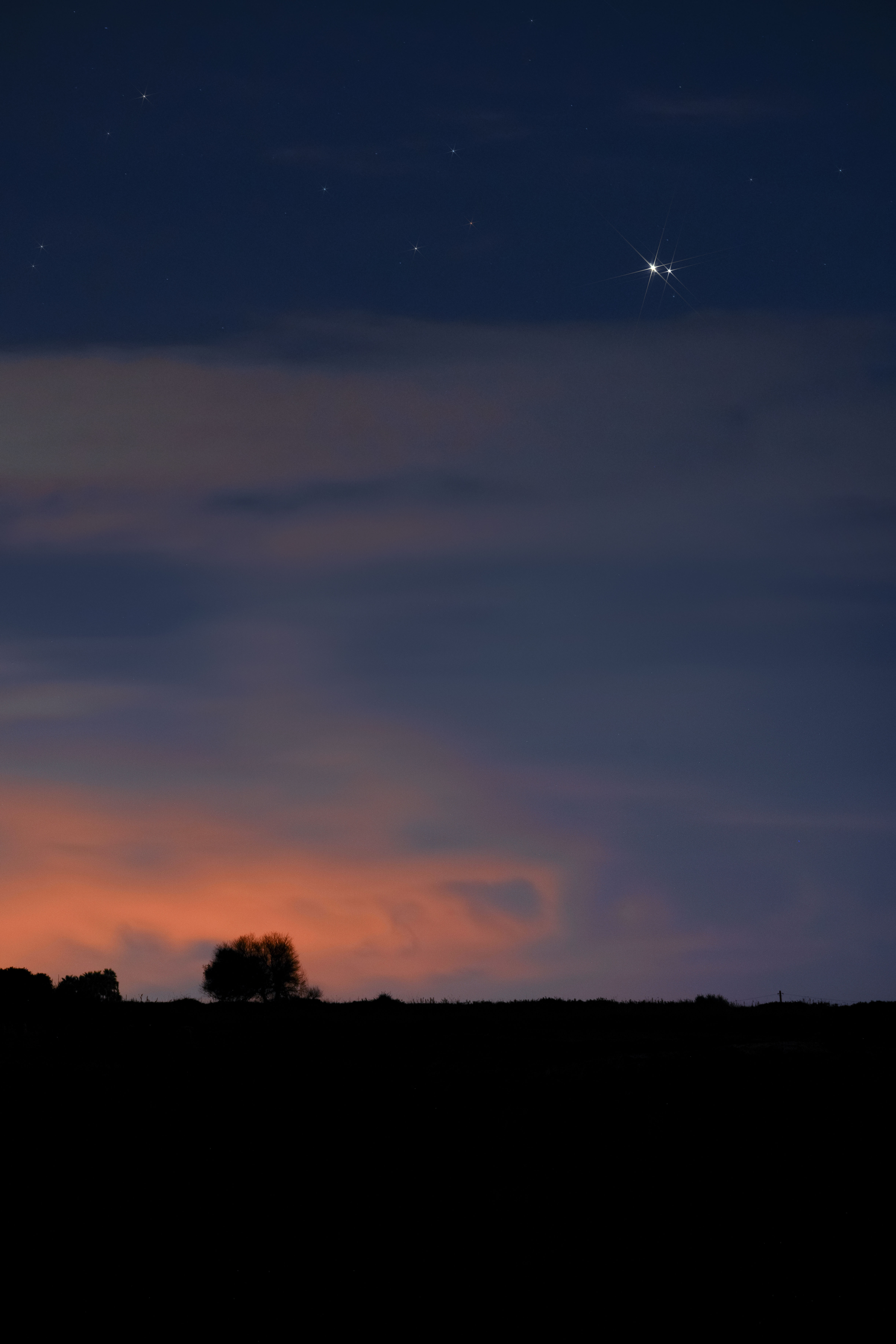
Photograph depicting the great conjunction, taken from Syracuse, Italy.

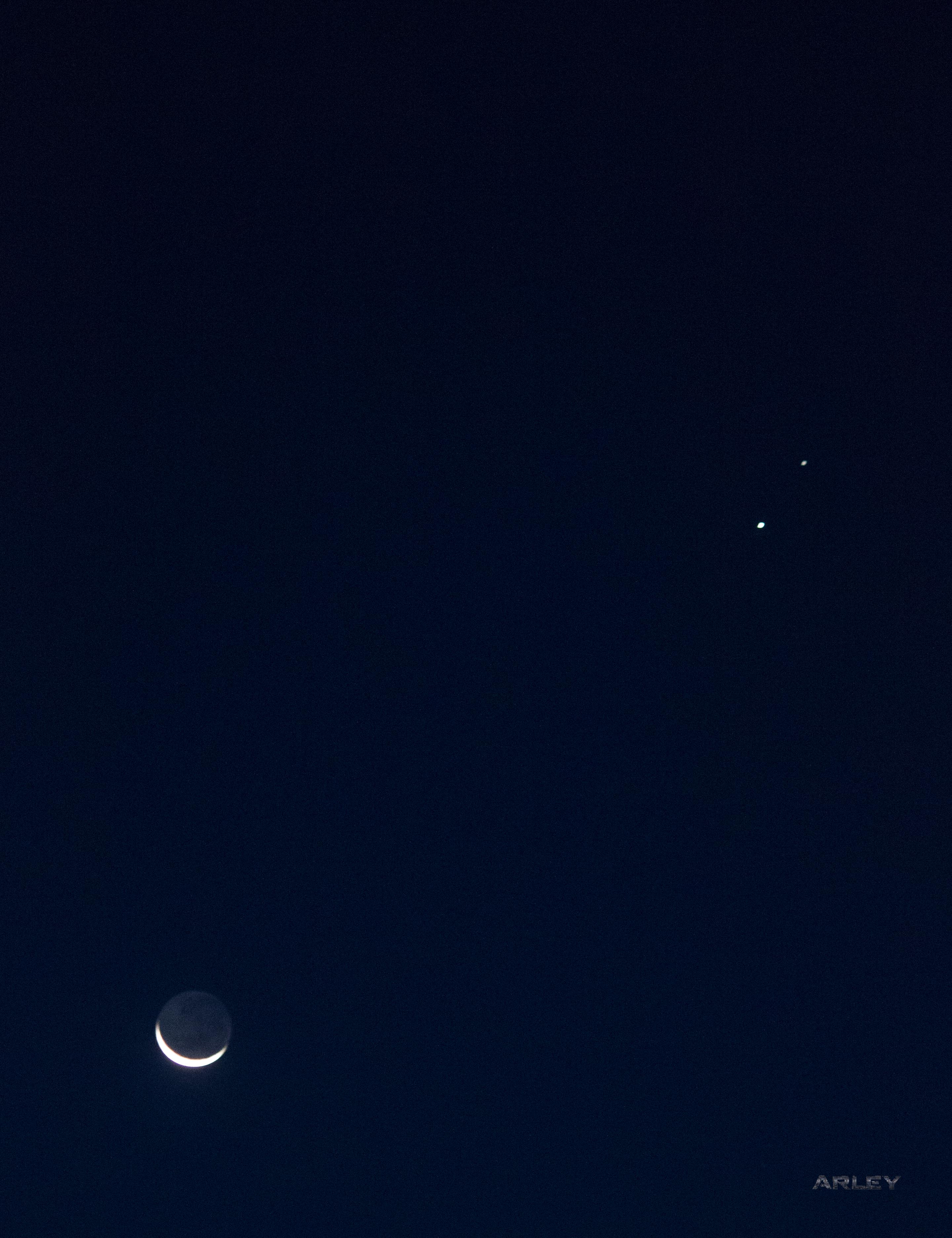
Photograph of Jupiter and Saturn with the Moon on 16 December 2020

=== 7541 ===
As well as being a triple conjunction, the great conjunction of 7541 is expected to feature two occultations: one partial on 16 February, and one total on 17 June. Superimposition requires a separation of less than approximately 0.4 arcminutes. This will be the first occultation between the two planets since 6857 BC, and the only instance of two occultations within the same year in maybe a million years.

== See also ==
- Positional astronomy
