= SN 1885A =

1885 supernova in the Andromeda Galaxy

Supernova 1885
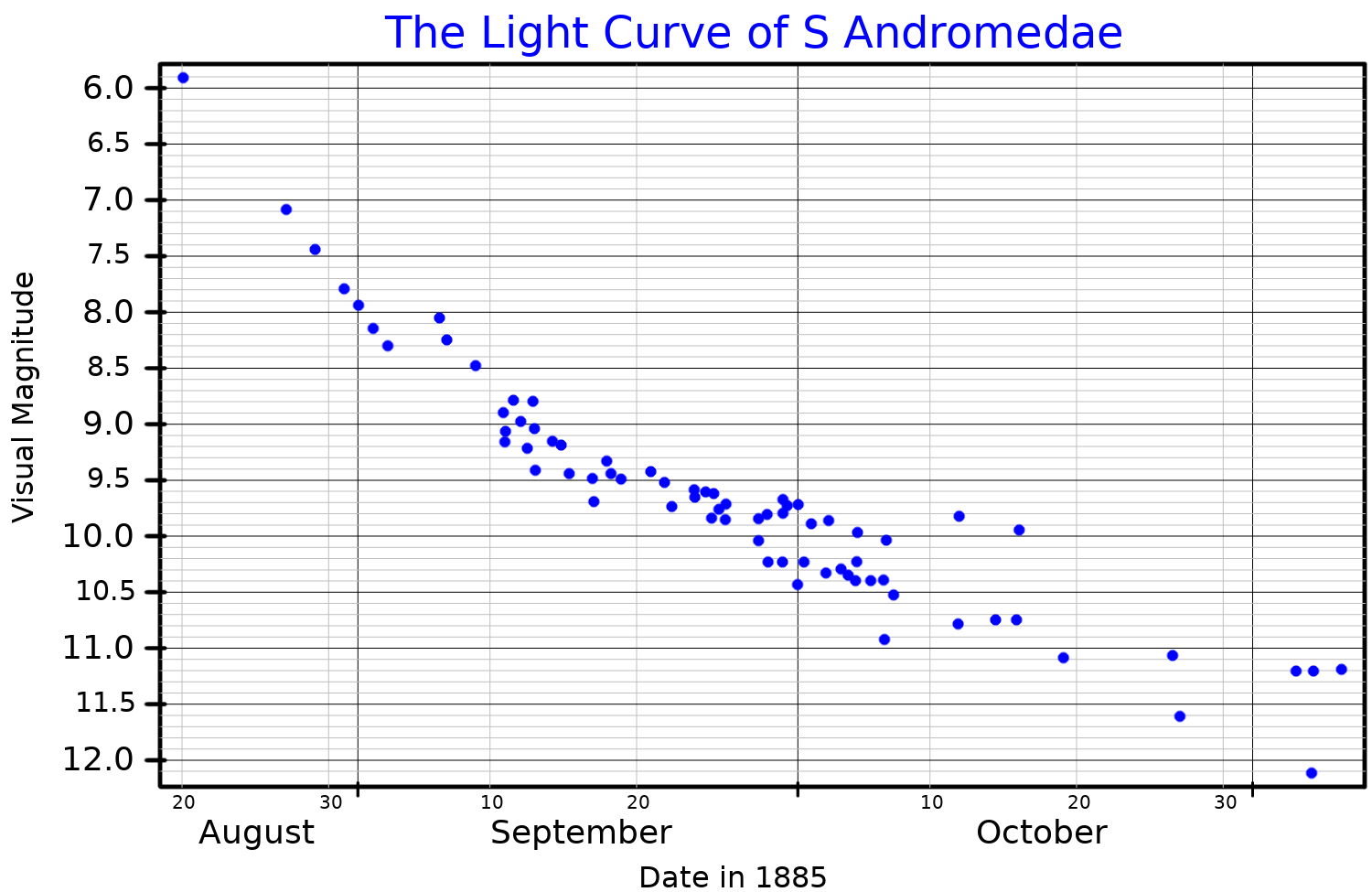
- The visual band light curve of S Andromedae, adapted from Patchett et al. (1985)
- Event type: Supernova, supernova remnant, near-infrared source, variable star, Cataclysmic variable star
- I pec
- Date: 20 August 1885 UTC
- Constellation: Andromeda
- Right ascension: 00^{h} 42^{m} 43.11^{s}
- Declination: +41° 16′ 04.2′′
- Epoch: J2000.0
- Galactic coordinates: 121.1702 -21.5741
- Distance: 2.6 Mly
- Remnant: Unknown
- Host: Andromeda Galaxy
- Progenitor: Unknown
- Progenitor type: Unknown
- Colour (B-V): +1.3 ~ +0.6
- Notable features: First and only supernova observed in Andromeda; first extragalactic supernova observed; closest Type Ia observed
- Peak apparent magnitude: +6
- Other designations: SN 1885A, HR 182, 2MASS J00424312+4116032, BD+40 147a, S And, TIC 438234291, AAVSO 0037+40, EV* M31 V0894
- Preceded by: SN 1604 (observed), Cassiopeia A (unobserved, c. 1680), G1.9+0.3 (unobserved, c. 1868)
- Followed by: SN 1895B

SN 1885A (also S Andromedae) was a supernova in the Andromeda Galaxy, the only one seen in that galaxy by astronomers. It was the first supernova ever seen outside the Milky Way, though it was not appreciated at the time due to how far away it was. It is also known as "Supernova 1885".

== Discovery ==
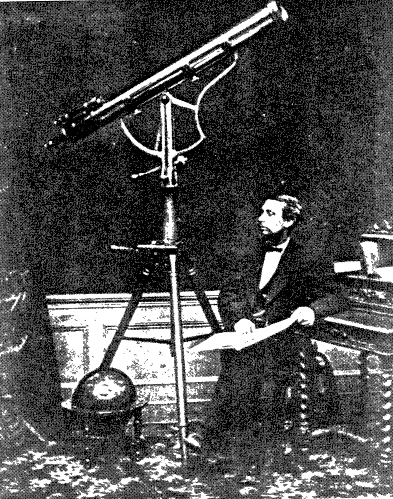
Isaac Ward

The supernova appears to have been seen first on August 17, 1885, by French astronomer Ludovic Gully during a public stargazing event. Gully thought it was scattered moonlight in his telescope and did not follow up on this observation. Irish amateur astronomer Isaac Ward in Belfast claimed to have seen the object on August 19, 1885, but did not immediately publish its existence.

The independent detection of the supernova by Ernst Hartwig at Dorpat (Tartu) Observatory in Estonia on August 20, 1885, however, was communicated in a telegram on August 31, 1885, once Hartwig had verified in more ideal circumstances that the feature was not caused by reflected moonlight. The telegram prompted widespread observations of the event, and prompted Isaac Ward, Ludovic Gully, and several others to publish their earlier observations (the first reports on S Andromedae appeared before Hartwig's discovery letter which followed his telegram, since the letter was initially lost by Astronomische Nachrichten and only reprinted in a later issue). The history of the discovery is summarized by K.G. Jones and de Vaucouleurs and H. G. Corwin Jr. Both studies doubt that Ward really saw the event since his estimated magnitude is significantly off from the later reconstructed light curve, and conclude that Hartwig should be considered as the discoverer of the supernova.

== Features ==
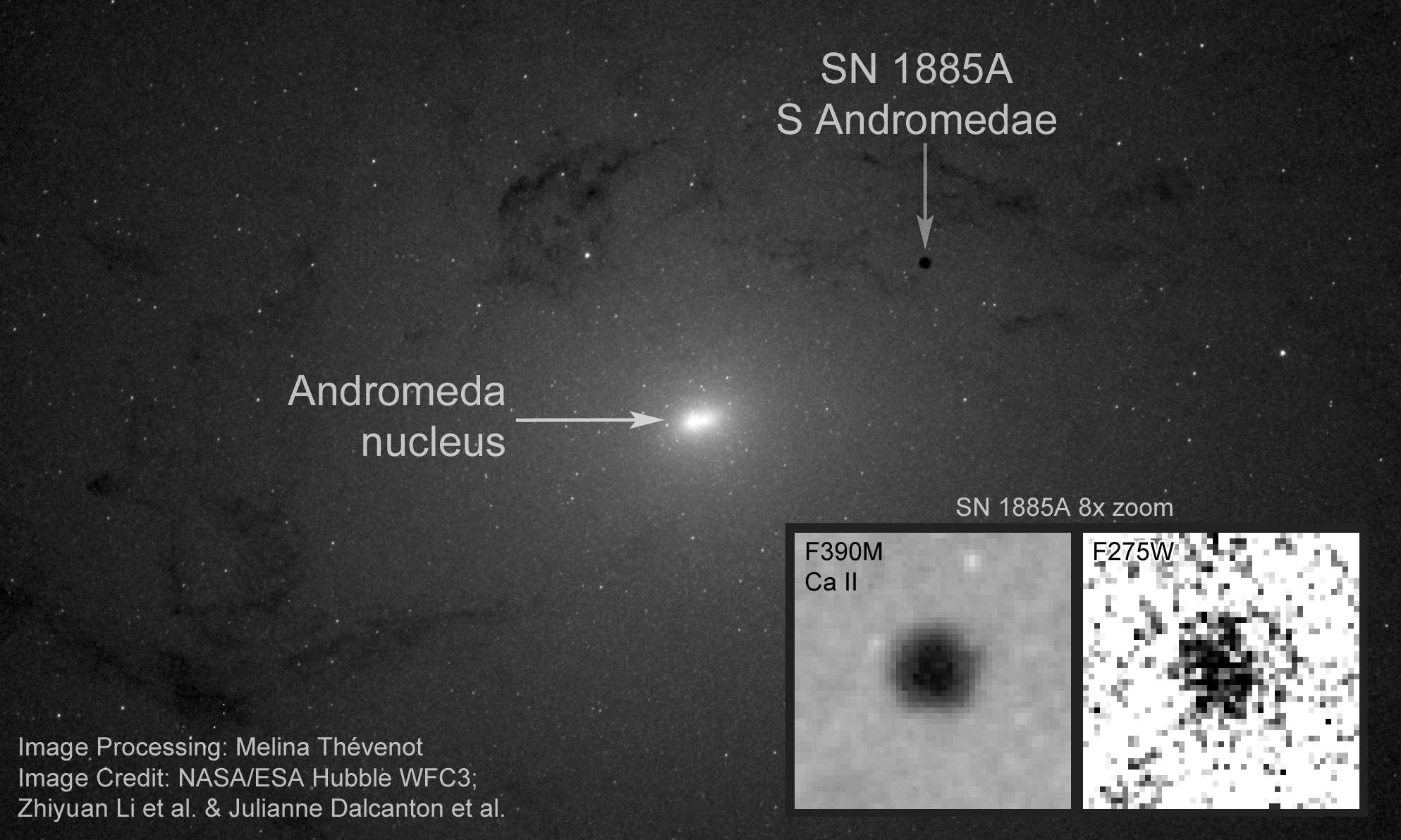
Hubble image of the remnant in absorption.

SN 1885A reached magnitude 5.85 on 21 August 1885, and faded to magnitude 14 six months later. It was reddish in color and declined rapidly in brightness, which is unusual for Type Ia supernovae. Some astronomers observed the spectrum of the star visually (no photographic spectral observations were made in that time). These observations were made at the limit of visibility, but they were considered to be in good agreement with each other and with modern data on typical supernovae of Type Ia; SN 1885A has thus been assigned to this type. Studies led by Dovi Poznanski and by Hagai Perets suggest that SN 1885A belongs to a new subclass of Type I supernovae, along with SN 2002bj and SN 1939B.

The supernova occurred at an angular separation of 16″ from the relatively bright nucleus of the galaxy. This made detection of its remnant difficult – early attempts were unsuccessful. In 1988, R. A. Fesen and others used the 4-meter Mayall telescope at Kitt Peak to discover the iron-rich remnant of the explosion. Further observations were made with the Hubble Space Telescope in 1999. The spectrum of the remnant shows the presence of iron, calcium and manganese, which were likely created during the explosion. There is some evidence for spherical symmetry in the explosion; this would mean that this Type Ia supernova was not triggered by merging.
