= Sigma-D relation =

The Sigma-D relation, or Σ-D relation, is the claimed relation between the radio surface brightness and diameter of a supernova remnant. It is generally regarded as of limited physical use, since it has very large scatter and is dominated by observational selection biases.
