= De Stella Nova =

Book by Johannes Kepler

De Stella Nova in Pede Serpentarii et qui sub ejus exortum de novo iniit, Trigono igneo
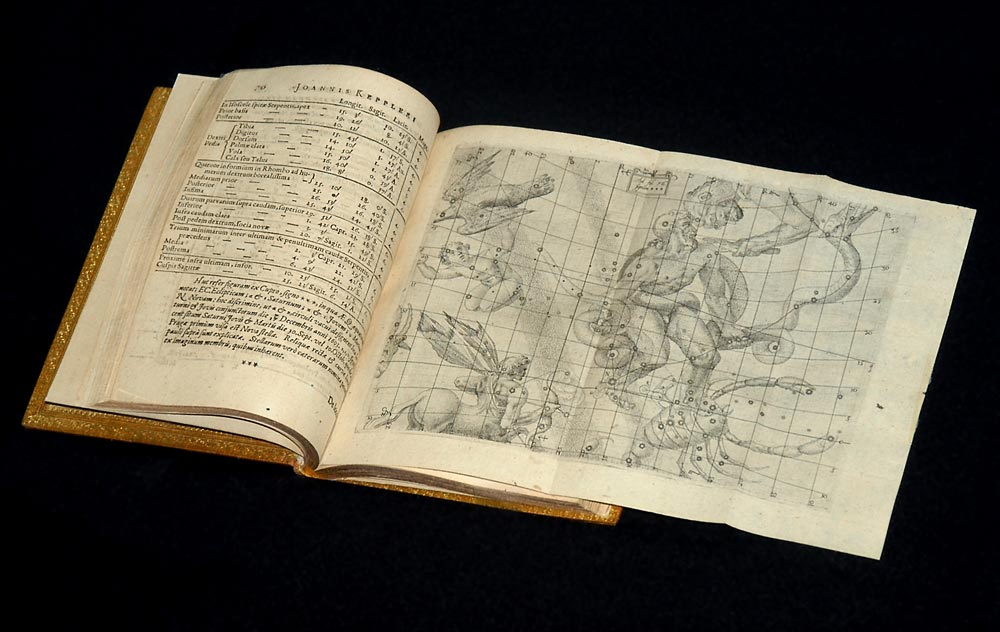
- Book opened to display image with the Supernova located in the foot of the serpent bearer
- Author: Johannes Kepler
- Language: Latin
- Publisher: Paul Sessius
- Publication date: 1606
- Publication place: Kingdom of Bohemia
- Pages: [6] leaves, 212 pages, 35 pages, [2] leaves
- Website: https://mdz-nbn-resolving.de/details:bsb10873675

De Stella Nova in Pede Serpentarii (On the New Star in the Foot of the Serpent Handler), generally known as De Stella Nova was a book written by Johannes Kepler between 1605 and 1606, when the book was published in Prague.

Kepler wrote the book following the appearance of the supernova SN 1604, also known as Kepler's Supernova. This star appeared in the constellation Ophiuchus, the Greek (Ὀφιοῦχος Ophioukhos) "serpent-bearer" which is also known in Latin as Serpentarius.

The SN 1604 supernova was observable for almost a year, from October 1604 to October 1605. Observation conditions were good, particularly when it was first visible. A conjunction of Jupiter and Mars happened to be taking place near the place where the supernova appeared, meaning that astronomers happened to be looking in its direction. As a result there were many witnesses to its appearance, but Kepler's observations were particularly meticulous. The care he took not only to record his own observations but to compile the observations of other astronomers make De Stella Nova a very important record both of the supernova itself, and of the astronomy of the early 17th century.

== Position ==
As soon as the ‘new star’ appeared, Kepler began recording his observations, measuring its angular distance from known stars such as σ Sagittarii, η Ophiuchi, α Ophiuchi, ζ Ophiuchi, α Aquilae and α Scorpii. With a typical error of less than one minute of arc, remarkable for observations made with the naked eye, he established that it had no noticeable movement. The low declination of the supernova over the latitude Kepler was observing from (Prague, around 50° north) likely caused atmospheric refraction, explaining most of Kepler’s errors. It is hard to be sure however, since Kepler’s book gives no indication of the times or atmospheric conditions of his observations. Kepler also mentions the measurements made by David Fabricius in Osteel, which agreed with his own. (They were so precise that in 1943 they allowed Walter Baade to locate the supernova remnant, SNR G4.5+6.8).

Kepler’s measurements allowed him to be certain that the ‘new star’ showed no parallax. Thus, as suggested by the supernova observed 32 years previously by Tycho Brahe (SN 1572), were too far away for any kind of parallax to be noticed with the instrumentation of the time.

== Light curve ==
Kepler also mentioned his measures of the object’s brightness, which compared it with Jupiter, Venus, Mars and several nearby stars. These were sufficiently precise and extended over a year, allowing the supernova’s light curve to be reconstructed.
