= G1.9+0.3 =

Supernova remnant in the constellation of Sagittarius

Supernova remnant G1.9+0.3
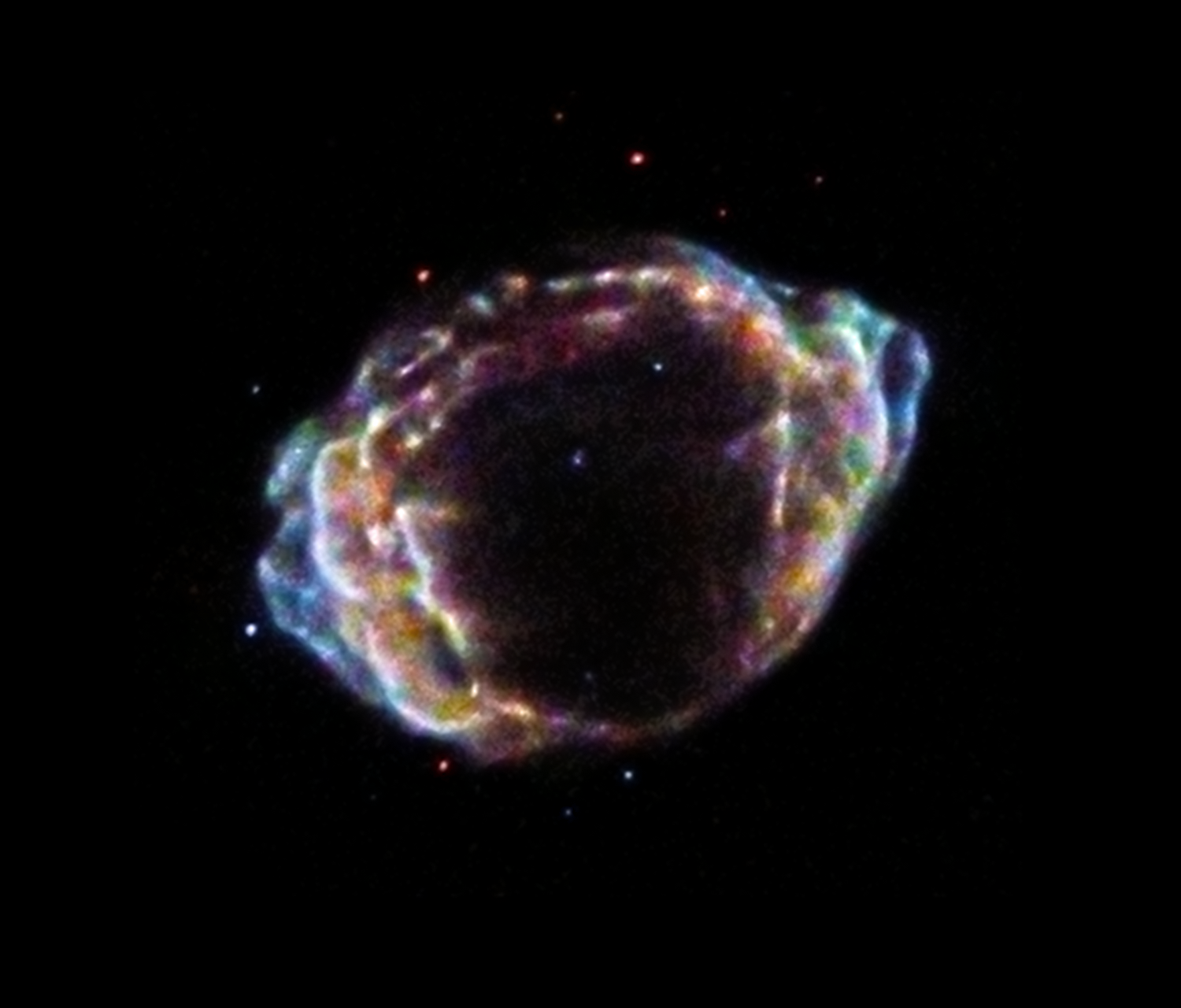
- Event type: Supernova remnant
- Date: c. 27,600 years ago (detected 1984)
- Instrument: VLA radio telescope
- Constellation: Sagittarius
- Right ascension: 17^{h} 48^{m} 45.4^{s}
- Declination: −27° 10′ 06″
- Distance: c. 27,700 ly
- Host: Milky Way
- Progenitor: 2 White dwarfs
- Other designations: NVSS J174846-270950, F3R 101, RFS 24, [SKM2002] 41, [SKM2002] G001.9+0.3, [ADP79] 001.873+0.323, MGPS J174846-270950
- Preceded by: SN 1604 (observed), Cassiopeia A (unobserved, c. 1680)
- Followed by: SN 1885A
- Related media on Commons

G1.9+0.3 is a supernova remnant (SNR) in the constellation of Sagittarius. It is the youngest-known SNR in the Milky Way, resulting from an explosion the light from which would have reached Earth some time between 1890 and 1908. The explosion was not seen from Earth as it was obscured by the dense gas and dust of the Galactic Center, where it occurred. The remnant's young age was established by combining data from NASA's Chandra X-ray Observatory and the VLA radio observatory. It was a Type Ia supernova. The remnant has a radius of over 1.3 light-years.

== Discovery ==
G1.9+0.3 was first identified as an SNR in 1984 from observations made with the VLA radio telescope. Because of its unusually small angular size, it was thought to be young—less than around 1,000 years old. In 2007, X-ray observations made with the Chandra X-ray Observatory revealed that the object was about 15% larger than in the earlier VLA observations. Further observations made with the VLA in 2008 verified increase in size, implying it is no more than 150 years old. A more recent estimate put its observable age at 110 years as of the data collection in 2008. That study also found that it was probably triggered by the merger of two white dwarf stars.

== Announcement ==
The discovery that G1.9+0.3 had been identified as the youngest-known Galactic SNR was announced on May 14, 2008 at a NASA press conference. In the days leading up to the announcement, NASA said that they were going "to announce the discovery of an object in our Galaxy astronomers have been hunting for more than 50 years." Before this discovery, the youngest-known Milky Way supernova remnant was Cassiopeia A, at about 330 years.
