= Kepler's Supernova =

Supernova visible from Earth in the 17th century

SN 1604
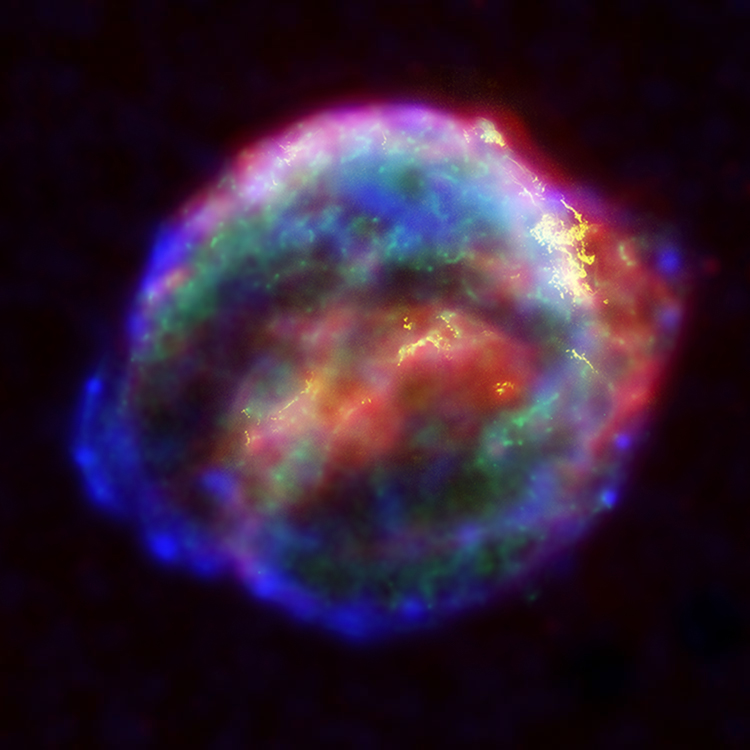
- A false-color composite (CXO/HST/Spitzer Space Telescope) image of the supernova remnant nebula from SN 1604
- Event type: Supernova
- Ia
- Date: 8–9 October 1604
- Right ascension: 17^{h} 30^{m} 42^{s}
- Declination: −21° 29′
- Epoch: J2000
- Galactic coordinates: G4.5+6.8
- Distance: Less than 20,000 light-years (6.1 kpc)
- Remnant: Shell
- Host: Milky Way
- Progenitor: White dwarf–red giant double star system
- Progenitor type: Type Ia supernova
- Colour (B-V): Unknown
- Notable features: Latest observed supernova in the Milky Way. Maintained naked-eye visibility for 18 months.
- Peak apparent magnitude: −2.25 to −2.5
- Other designations: 1ES 1727-21.4, 3C 358, ESO 588-4, GCRV 67121, HR 6515, IRAS 17276-2126, MRC 1727-214, PK 004+06 1, PN G004.5+06.8, 1RXS J173040.4-212836, SN 1604A, IRAS Z17276-2126, SN 1604, AJG 71, CSI-21-17276, CTB 41, Kes 57, MSH 17-2-11, OHIO T -246, PKS 1727-21, PKS 1727-214, PKS J1730-2129, [PBD2003] G004.5+06.8
- Preceded by: SN 1572
- Followed by: Cassiopeia A (unobserved, c. 1680), G1.9+0.3 (unobserved, c. 1868), SN 1885A (next observed)
- Related media on Commons

SN 1604, also known as Kepler's Supernova, Kepler's Nova or Kepler's Star, was a Type Ia supernova that occurred in the Milky Way, in the constellation Ophiuchus. Appearing in October 1604, it is the most recent supernova in the Milky Way galaxy to have been unquestionably observed by the naked eye, occurring no farther than 6 kiloparsecs (20,000 light-years) from Earth. Before the adoption of the current naming system for supernovae, it was named for Johannes Kepler, the German astronomer who described it in De Stella Nova.

== Observation ==
Visible to the naked eye, Kepler's Star was brighter at its peak than any other star in the night sky, with an apparent magnitude of −2.5. It was visible during the day for over three weeks. Records of its sighting exist in European, Chinese, Korean, and Arabic sources.

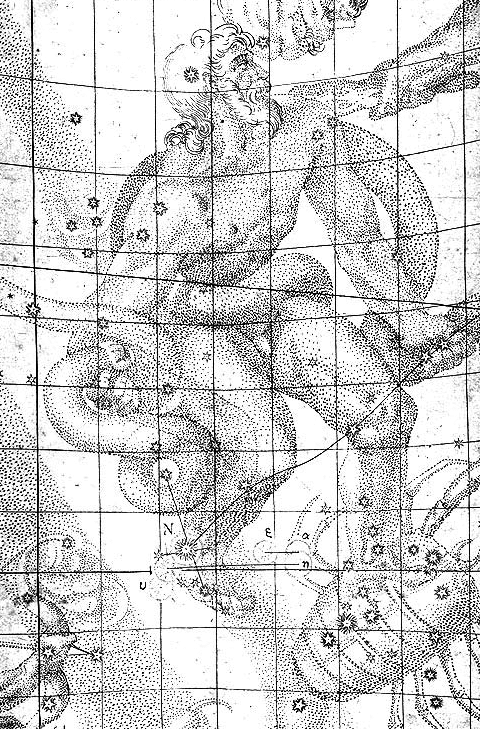
Johannes Kepler's original drawing from De Stella Nova (1606) depicting the location of the stella nova, marked with an N (8 grid squares down, 4 over from the left)

It was the second supernova to be observed in a generation (after SN 1572 seen by Tycho Brahe in Cassiopeia). No further supernovae have since been observed with certainty in the Milky Way, though many others outside the galaxy have been seen since S Andromedae in 1885. SN 1987A in the Large Magellanic Cloud was visible to the naked eye at night.

Evidence exists for two Milky Way supernovae whose electromagnetic radiation would have reached Earth c. 1680 and 1870 – Cassiopeia A, and G1.9+0.3 respectively. There is no historical record of either having been detected in those years, likely because absorption by interstellar dust obscured their visible light.

The remnant of Kepler's supernova is considered to be one of the prototypical objects of its kind and is still an object of much study in astronomy.

== Controversies ==
Astronomers of the time (including Kepler) were concerned with observing the conjunction of Mars, Jupiter, and Saturn, which they saw as an auspicious conjunction linked to the Star of Bethlehem. However, cloudy weather prevented Kepler from making observations. Wilhelm Fabry, Michael Maestlin, and Helisaeus Roeslin were able to make observations of the conjunction on 9 October, but did not record the supernova. The first recorded observation in Europe was by Lodovico delle Colombe in northern Italy on 9 October 1604. Kepler was only able to begin his observations on 17 October while working at the imperial court in Prague for Emperor Rudolf II. The supernova was subsequently named after him, even though he was not its first observer, as his observations tracked the object for an entire year. These observations were described in his book De Stella nova in pede Serpentarii ("On the new star in Ophiuchus's foot", Prague 1606).

=== Delle Colombe–Galileo controversy ===
In 1606, Delle Colombe published Discourse of Lodovico delle Colombe in which he shows that the "Star Newly Appeared in October 1604 is neither a Comet nor a New Star" and where he defended an Aristotelian view of cosmology after Galileo Galilei had used the occasion of the supernova to challenge the Aristotelian system. The description of Galileo's claims is as follows:

Galileo explained the meaning and relevance of parallax, reported that the nova displayed none, and concluded, as a certainty, that it lay beyond the moon. Here he might have stopped, having dispatched his single arrow. Instead he sketched a theory that ruined the Aristotelian cosmos: the nova very probably consisted of a large quantity of airy material that issued from the earth and shone by reflected sunlight, like Aristotelian comets. Unlike them, however, it could rise beyond the moon. It not only brought change to the heavens, but did so provocatively by importing corruptible earthy elements into the pure quintessence. That raised heaven-shattering possibilities. The interstellar space might be filled with something similar to our atmosphere, as in the physics of the Stoics, to which Tycho had referred in his lengthy account of the nova of 1572. And if the material of the firmament resembled that of bodies here below, a theory of motion built on experience with objects within our reach might apply also to the celestial regions. "But I am not so bold as to think that things cannot take place differently from the way I have specified."

=== Kepler–Roeslin controversy ===
In Kepler's De Stella Nova (1606), he criticized Roeslin concerning this supernova. Kepler argued that in his astrological prognostications, Roeslin had picked out just the two comets, the Great Comet of 1556 and 1580. Roeslin responded in 1609 that this was indeed what he had done. When Kepler replied later that year, he simply observed that by including a broader range of data Roeslin could have made a better argument.

== Supernova remnant ==
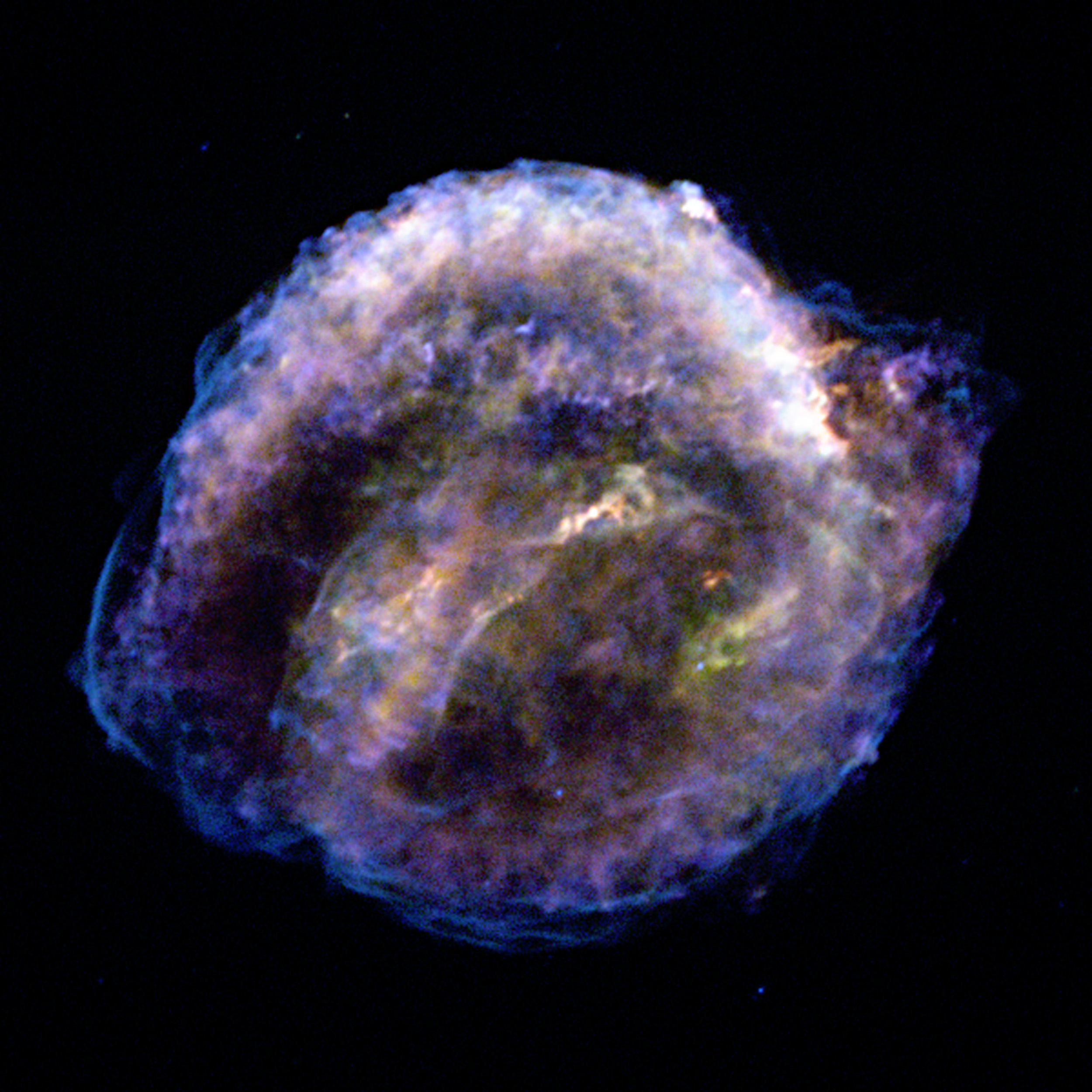
X-ray image of SN 1604 from the Chandra X-ray Observatory

The supernova remnant of SN 1604, Kepler's Star, was discovered in 1941 at the Mount Wilson Observatory as a dim nebula with a brightness of 19 mag. Only filaments can be seen in visible light, but it is a strong radio and X-ray source. Its diameter is 4 arc min. Distance estimates place it between 3 and more than 7 kiloparsecs (10,000 to 23,000 lightyears), with the current consensus being a distance of 5±1 kpc, as of 2021.

The available evidence supports a type Ia supernova as the source of this remnant, which is the result of a carbon-oxygen white dwarf interacting with a companion star. The integrated X-ray spectrum resembles that of Tycho's supernova remnant, a type Ia supernova. The abundance of oxygen relative to iron in the remnant of SN 1604 is roughly solar, whereas a core-collapse scenario should produce a much higher abundance of oxygen. No surviving central source has been identified, which is consistent with a type Ia event. Finally, the historical records for the brightness of this event are consistent with type Ia supernovae.

There is evidence for interaction of the supernova ejecta with circumstellar matter from the progenitor star, which is unexpected for type Ia but has been observed in some cases. A bow shock located to the north of this system is believed to have been created by mass loss prior to the explosion. Observations of the remnant are consistent with the interaction of a supernova with a bipolar planetary nebula that belonged to one or both of the progenitor stars. The remnant is not spherically symmetric, which is likely due to the progenitor being a runaway star system. The bow shock is caused by the interaction of the advancing stellar wind with the interstellar medium. A remnant rich in nitrogen and silicon indicates that the system consisted of a white dwarf with an evolved companion that had likely already passed through the asymptotic giant branch stage.

== See also ==
- List of supernova remnants
- List of supernovae
- Supernova Early Warning System
