= Cassiopeia A =

Supernova remnant in the constellation Cassiopeia

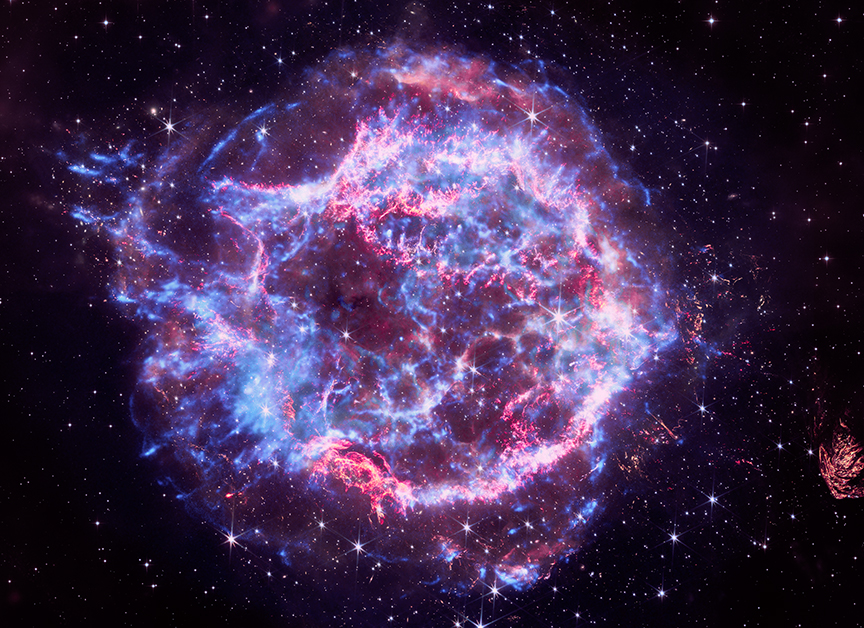
- Composite image of Cassiopeia A imaged by Chandra X-ray Observatory
- Event type: Supernova
- IIb
- Date: 1947 by Martin Ryle and Francis Graham-Smith)
- Constellation: Cassiopeia
- Right ascension: 23^{h} 23^{m} 26.0^{s}
- Declination: +58° 48′ 41″
- Epoch: J2000
- Galactic coordinates: 111.734745°, −02.129570°
- Distance: c. 11,000 ly
- Remnant: Shell
- Host: Milky Way
- Notable features: Strongest radio source beyond the Solar System
- Peak apparent magnitude: c. 6
- Other designations: SN 1671, SN 1667, SN 1680, SNR G111.7-02.1, 1ES 2321+58.5, 3C 461, 3C 461.0, 4C 58.40, 8C 2321+585, 1RXS J232325.4+584838, 3FHL J2323.4+5848, 2U 2321+58, 3A 2321+585, 3CR 461, 3U 2321+58, 4U 2321+58, AJG 109, CTB 110, INTREF 1108, [DGW65] 148, PBC J2323.3+5849, 2FGL J2323.4+5849, 3FGL J2323.4+5849, 2FHL J2323.4+5848
- Preceded by: SN 1604
- Followed by: G1.9+0.3 (unobserved, c. 1868), SN 1885A (next observed)
- Related media on Commons

Cassiopeia A (Cas A;) is a supernova remnant (SNR) in the constellation Cassiopeia and the brightest extrasolar radio source in the sky at frequencies below 1 GHz. The supernova occurred approximately 11,000 light-years (3.4 kpc) away within the Milky Way; given the width of the Orion Arm, it lies in the next-nearest arm outwards, the Perseus Arm, about 30 degrees from the Galactic anticenter. The expanding cloud of material left over from the supernova now appears approximately 10 light-years (3 pc) across from Earth's perspective. It has been seen in wavelengths of visible light with amateur telescopes down to 234 mm (9.25 in) with filters.

It is estimated that light from the supernova itself first reached Earth near the 1660s (±30 years), although there are no definitively corresponding records from then. Cas A is circumpolar at and above mid-Northern latitudes which had extensive records and basic telescopes. Its likely omission in records is probably due to interstellar dust absorbing optical wavelength radiation before it reached Earth, although it is possible that it was recorded as a sixth magnitude star 3 Cassiopeiae by John Flamsteed in 1680. Possible explanations lean toward the idea that the source star was unusually massive and had previously ejected much of its outer layers. These outer layers would have cloaked the star and absorbed much of the visible-light emission as the inner star collapsed.

Cas A was among the first discrete astronomical radio sources found. Its discovery was reported in 1948 by Martin Ryle and Francis Graham-Smith, astronomers at Cambridge, based on observations with the Long Michelson Interferometer. The optical component was first identified in 1950.

== Possible observations ==
Calculations working back from the currently observed expansion point to an explosion that would have become visible on Earth around 1667. Astronomer William Ashworth and others have suggested that the Astronomer Royal John Flamsteed inadvertently observed the supernova on 16 August [O.S. 6 August] 1680, when he catalogued a sixth-magnitude star 3 Cassiopeiae, but there is no corresponding star at the recorded position. It is estimated that the supernova should have reached a magnitude of 3.2 at its maximum and decayed to the 6th magnitude (as observed by Flamsteed) in 2 months after that. Possible alternative explanations include an error in the position, or that a transient was recorded. Caroline Herschel noted that a star in the vicinity of τ Cas, HD 220562, fitted well with 3 Cas if a common error in sextant readings was made. Alternatively, the star AR Cassiopeiae could have been observed, again with the position recorded incorrectly. The position and timing mean that it possibly was an observation of the Cassiopeia A progenitor supernova.

Another suggestion from recent cross-disciplinary research is that the supernova was the "noon day star", observed in 1630, that was thought to have heralded the birth of Charles II, the future monarch of Great Britain. However, it is more probable that the "noon day star" was the planet Venus that reached its maximum morning brightness two days earlier, allowing day time visibility in a clear sky. A bright supernova in Cassiopeia would have been visible for months and there would be more observation records as Cassiopeia is visible above the horizon any night in Europe.

No supernova occurring within the Milky Way has been visible to the naked eye from Earth since Kepler's Supernova of 1604, even with telescopes. The possible observation of the supernova resulting in the Cassiopeia A remnant would make the only exception. First light from the supernova remnant G1.9+0.3 reached Earth more recently than the first light from Cassiopeia A, but the associated supernova was not observed.

== Expansion ==
The expansion shell has a temperature of around 30 million K, and is expanding at 4,000−6,000 km/s.

Observations of the exploded star through the Hubble Space Telescope have shown that, despite the original belief that the remnants were expanding in a uniform manner, there are high velocity outlying eject knots moving with transverse velocities of 5,500−14,500 km/s with the highest speeds occurring in two nearly opposing jets. When the view of the expanding star uses colors to differentiate materials of different chemical compositions, it shows that similar materials often remain gathered together in the remnants of the explosion.

== Radio source ==
Cas A had a flux density of 2720 ± 50 Jy at 1 GHz in 1980. Because the supernova remnant is cooling, its flux density is decreasing. At 1 GHz, its flux density is decreasing at a rate of 0.97 ± 0.04 percent per year. This decrease means that, at frequencies below 1 GHz, Cas A is now less intense than Cygnus A. Cas A is still the brightest extrasolar radio source in the sky at frequencies above 1 GHz.

== X-ray source ==
Although Cas X-1 (or Cas XR-1), the apparent first X-ray source in the constellation Cassiopeia was not detected during the 16 June 1964, Aerobee sounding rocket flight, it was considered as a possible source. Cas A was scanned during another Aerobee rocket flight of 1 October 1964, but no significant X-ray flux above background was associated with the position. Cas XR-1 was discovered by an Aerobee rocket flight on 25 April 1965, at RA 23^{h} 21^{m} Dec +58° 30′. Cas X-1 is Cas A, a Type II SNR at RA 23^{h} 18^{m} Dec +58° 30′. The designations Cassiopeia X-1, Cas XR-1, Cas X-1 are no longer used, but the X-ray source is Cas A (SNR G111.7-02.1) at 2U 2321+58.

In 1999, the Chandra X-Ray Observatory found CXOU J232327.8+584842, a central compact object that is the neutron star remnant left by the explosion.

== Supernova reflected echo ==
In 2005 an infrared echo of the Cassiopeia A explosion was observed on nearby gas clouds using Spitzer Space Telescope. The infrared echo was also seen by IRAS and studied with the Infrared Spectrograph. Previously it was suspected that a flare in 1950 from a central pulsar could be responsible for the infrared echo. With the new data it was concluded that this is unlikely the case and that the infrared echo was caused by thermal emission by dust, which was heated by the radiative output of the supernova during the shock breakout. The infrared echo is accompanied by a scattered light echo. The recorded spectrum of the optical light echo proved the supernova was of Type IIb, meaning it resulted from the internal collapse and violent explosion of a massive star, most probably a red supergiant with a helium core which had lost almost all of its hydrogen envelope. This was the first observation of the light echo of a supernova whose explosion had not been directly observed which opens up the possibility of studying and reconstructing past astronomical events. In 2011 a study used spectra from different positions of the light echo to confirm that the Cassiopeia A supernova was asymmetric.

== Phosphorus detection ==
In 2013, astronomers detected phosphorus in Cassiopeia A, which confirmed that this element is produced in supernovae through supernova nucleosynthesis. The phosphorus-to-iron ratio in material from the supernova remnant could be up to 100 times higher than in the Milky Way in general.

== Gallery ==
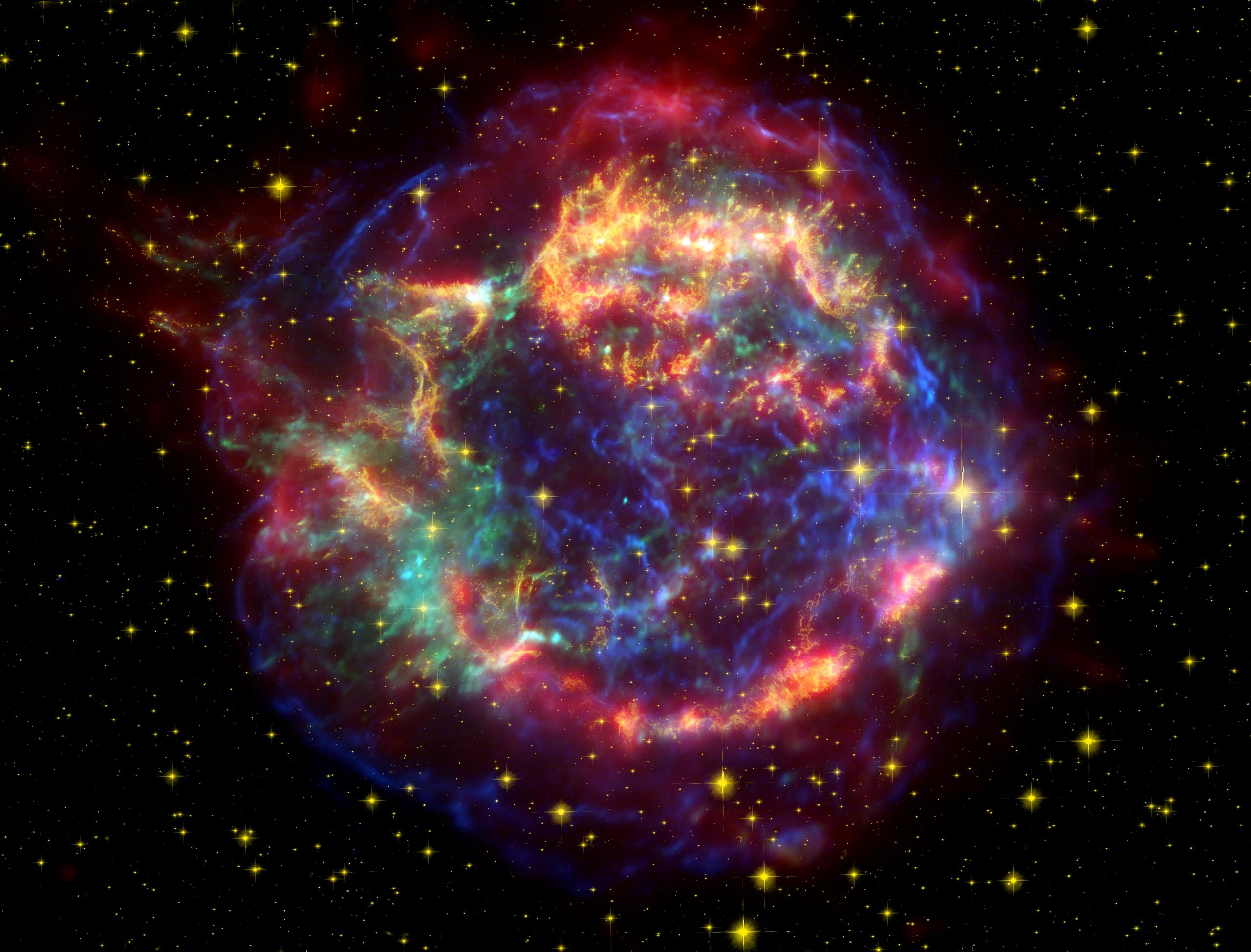
A false color image composed of data from three sources: Red is infrared data from the Spitzer Space Telescope, gold is visible data from the Hubble Space Telescope, and blue and green are data from the Chandra X-ray Observatory. The small, bright, baby-blue dot just off-center is the remnant of the star's core.

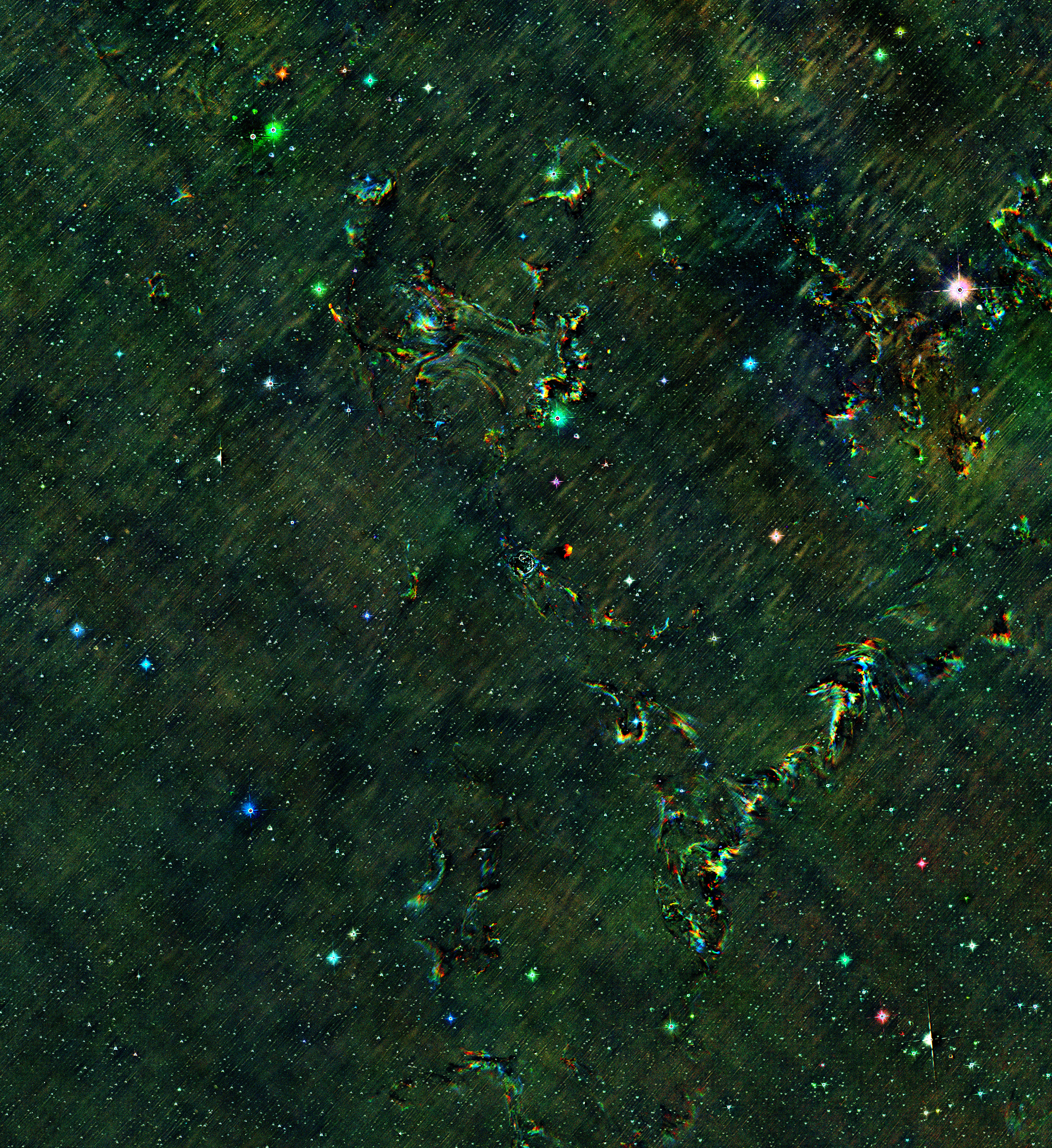
Cassiopeia A infrared echo as seen by unWISE. The observation time in this image ranges from 2015 (red) to 2020 (blue). The infrared echo appears as rainbow colored clouds. North is up.

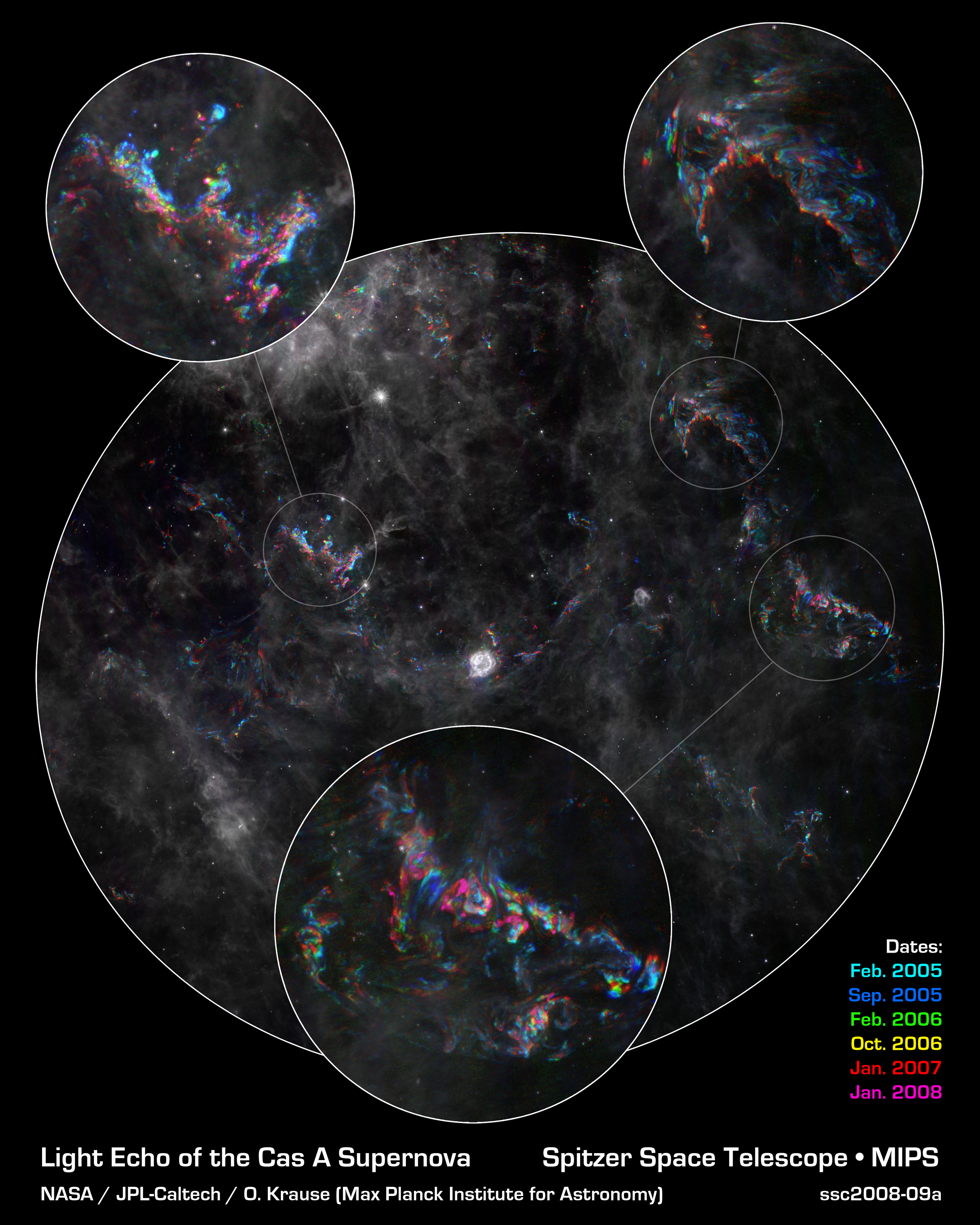
The infrared echo caused by the Cassiopeia A supernova seen by Spitzer. The image was processed in a way that the infrared echo appears colored while dust clouds remain grey. North is on the left.

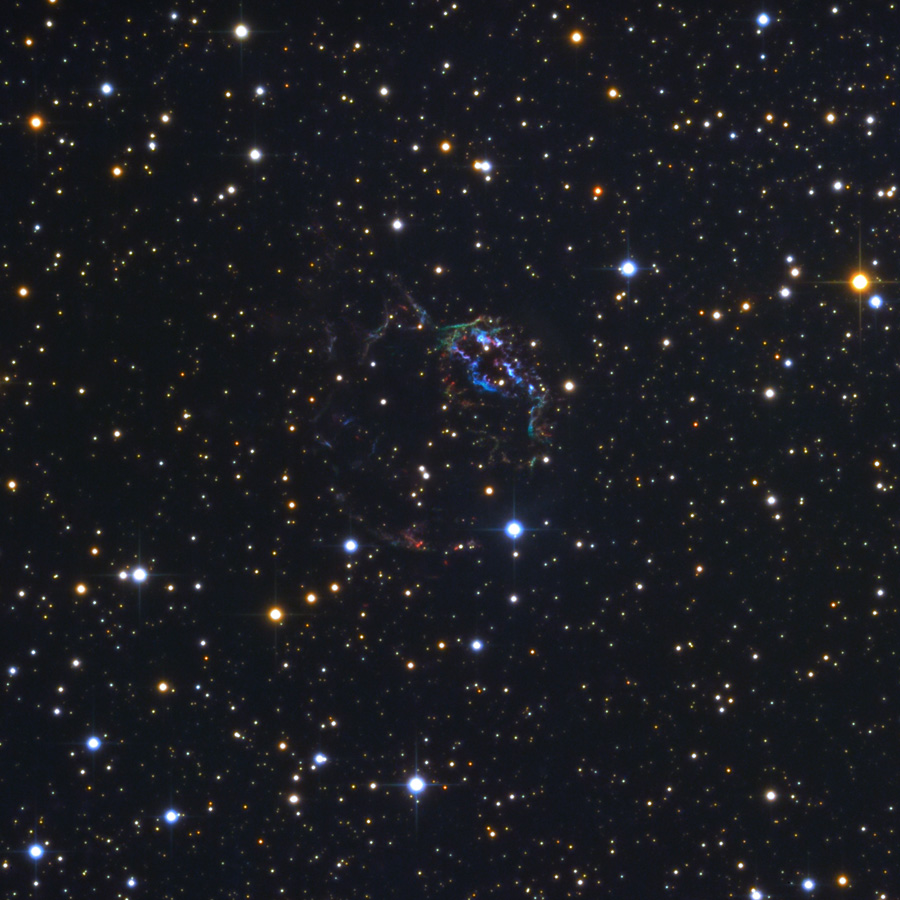
Cassiopeia A seen by the 24-inch Ritchey-Chrétien reflector at the Mount Lemmon Observatory

Cassiopeia A observed by the Hubble Space Telescope

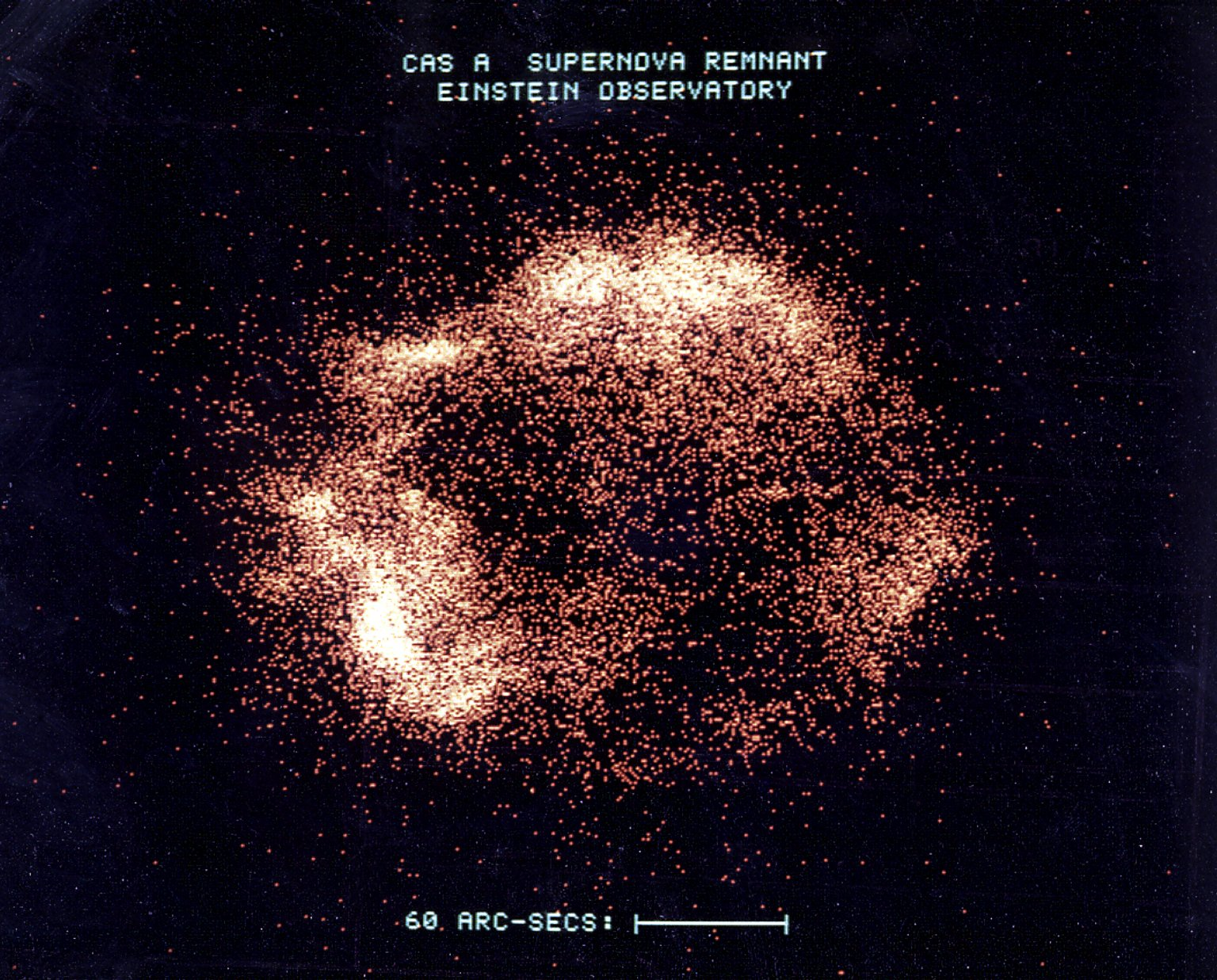
X-ray image of Cassiopeia A taken with the Einstein Observatory

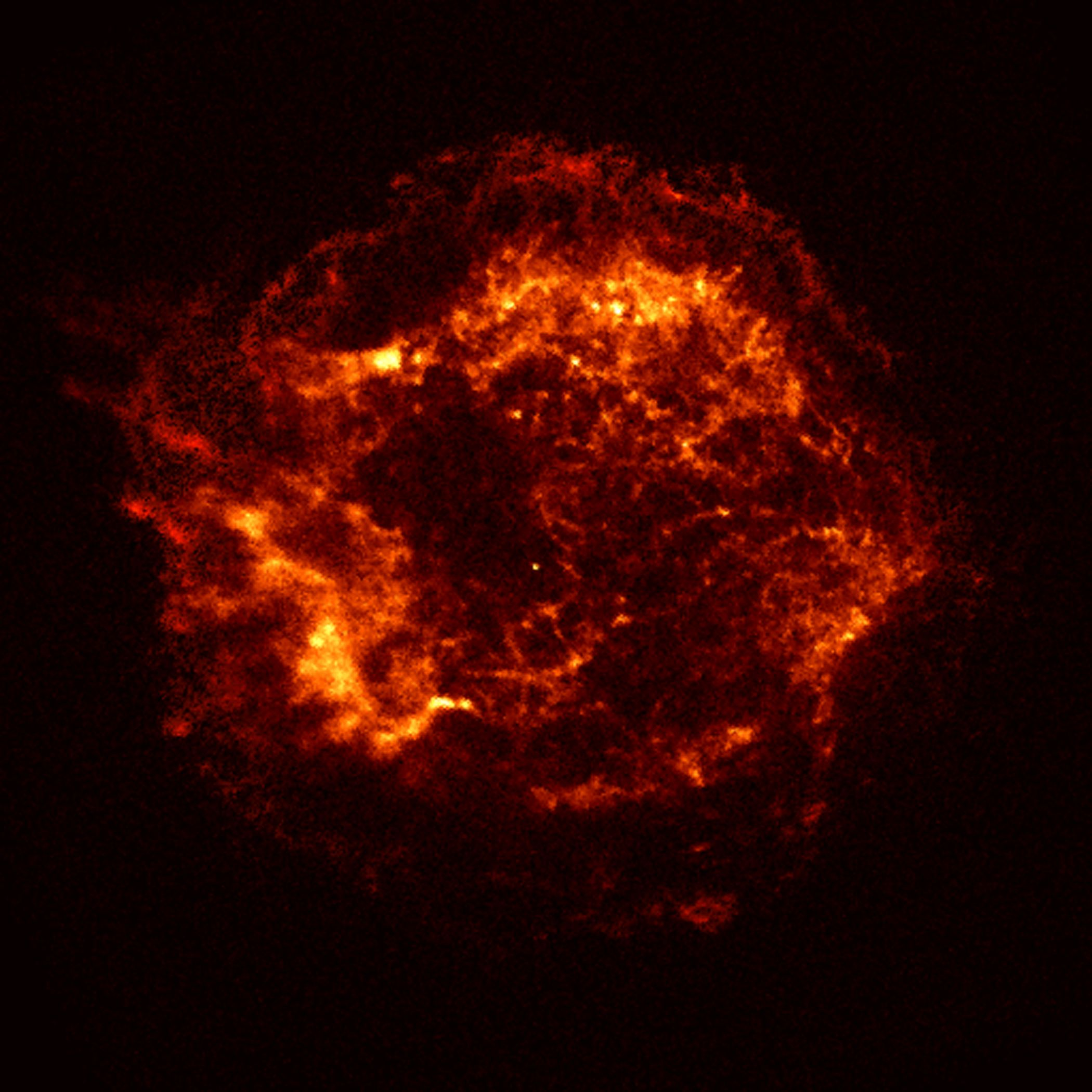
Cassiopeia A was the first light image of the Chandra X-ray Observatory

Near-Infrared Camera (NIRCam) image of Cassiopeia A

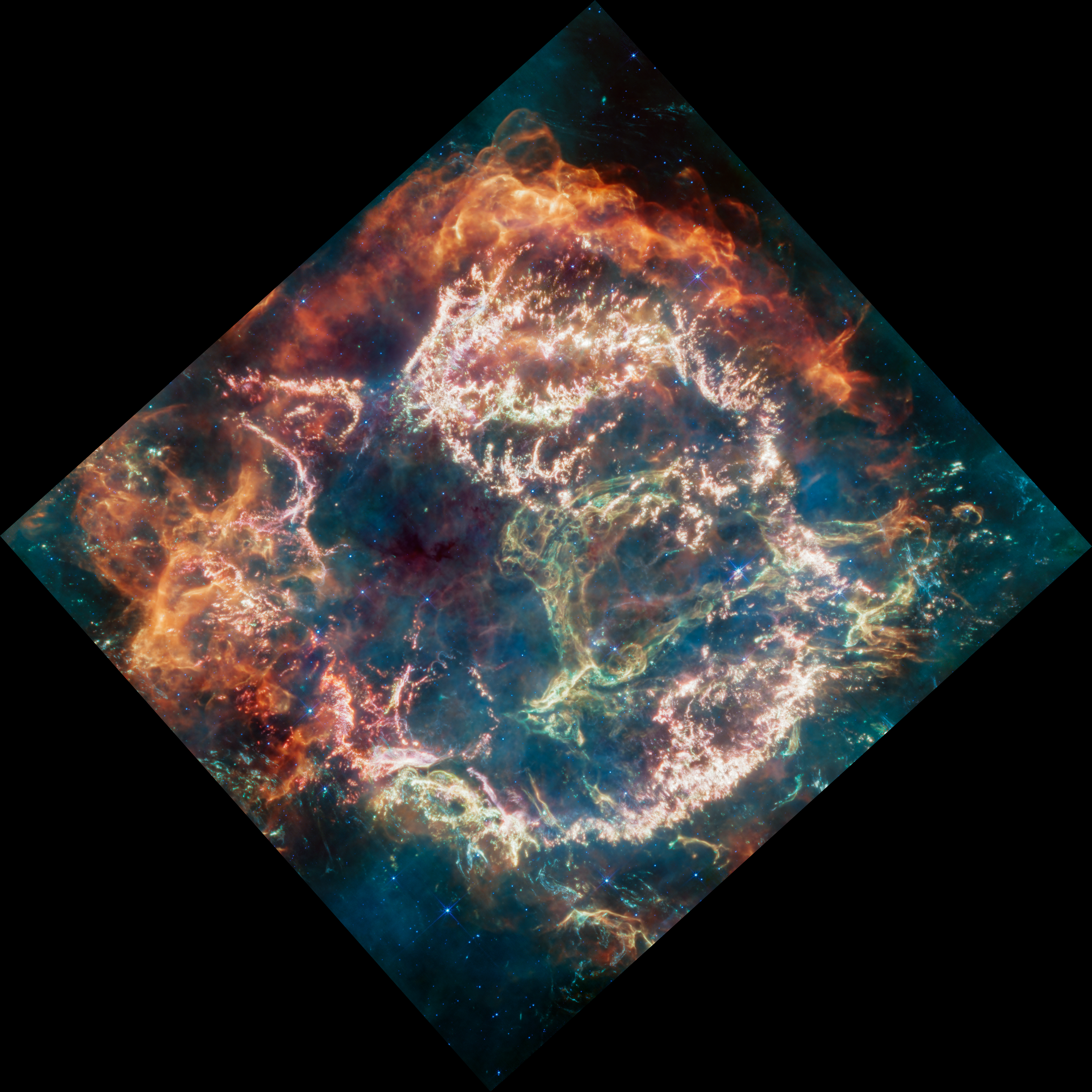
Cassiopeia A observed by the JWST's Mid-Infrared Instrument (MIRI)

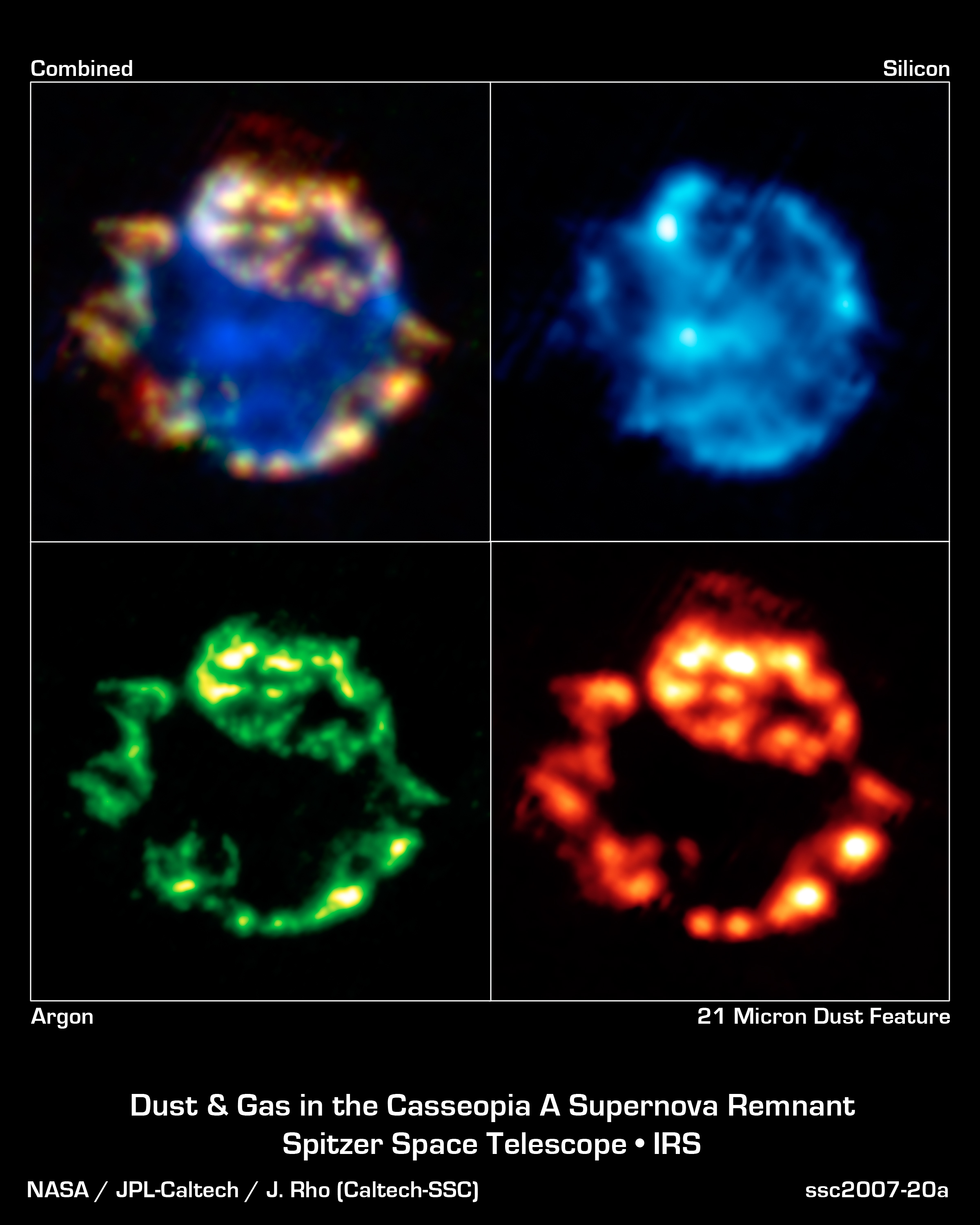
Cassiopeia A seen by Spitzer and showing different chemical elements and dust within the supernova remnant

== See also ==
- List of supernova remnants
- Light echo
