= Supernova remnant =

Remnants of an exploded star

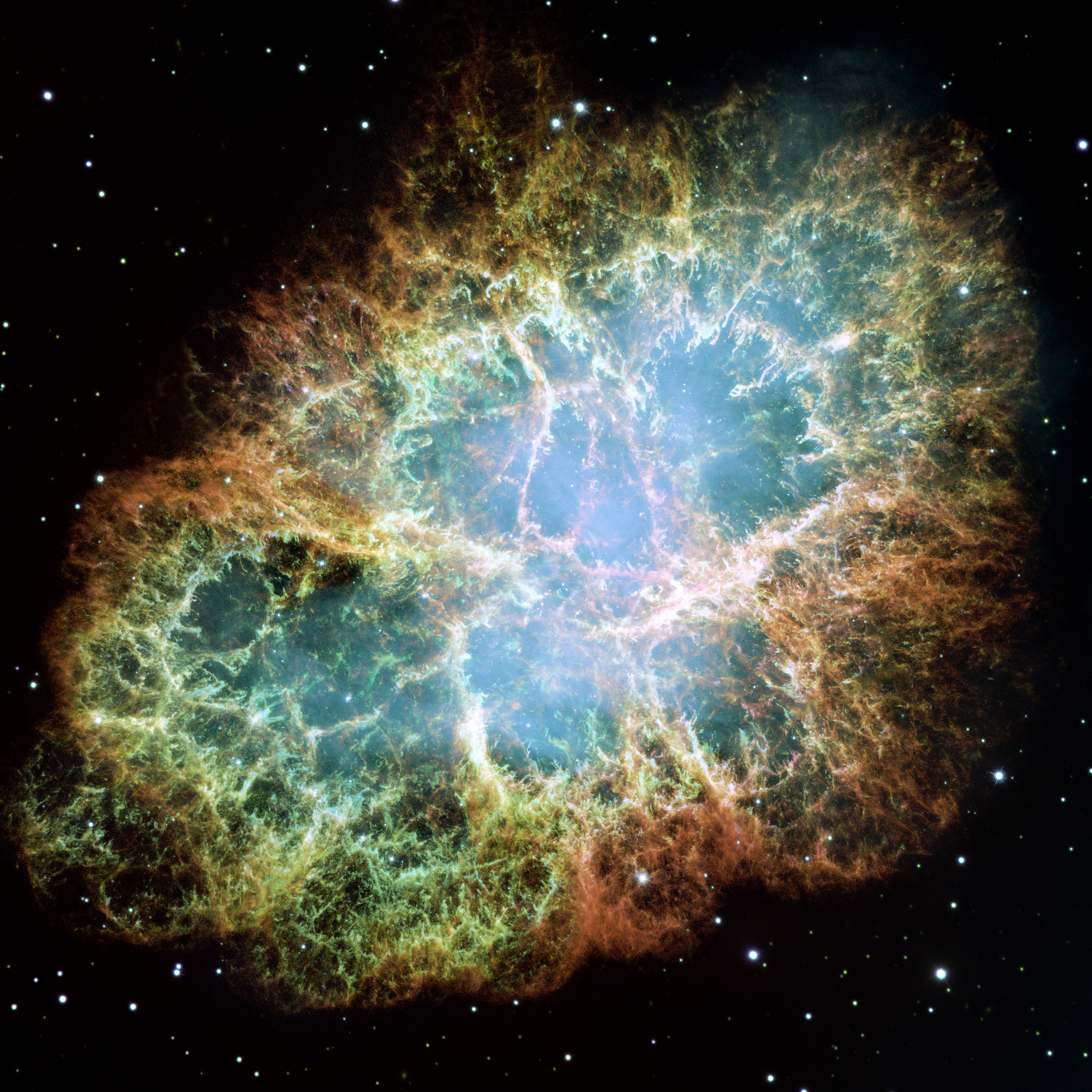
SN 1054 remnant (Crab Nebula).

A supernova remnant (SNR) is the structure resulting from the explosion of a star in a supernova. The supernova remnant is bounded by an expanding shock wave. It consists of ejected material expanding from the explosion, and the interstellar material it sweeps up and shocks along the way.

There are two common routes to a supernova: either a massive star may run out of fuel, ceasing to generate fusion energy in its core, and collapsing inward under the force of its own gravity to form a neutron star or a black hole; or a white dwarf star may accrete material from a companion star until it reaches a critical mass and undergoes a carbon detonation.

In either case, the resulting supernova explosion expels much or all of the stellar material with velocities as much as 10% the speed of light (or approximately 30,000 km/s) and a strong shock wave forms ahead of the ejecta that heats the upstream plasma up to temperatures well above millions of K. The shock continuously slows as it sweeps up the ambient medium, but it can expand over hundreds or thousands of years and tens of parsecs before its speed falls below the local sound speed.

One of the best-observed young supernova remnants was formed by SN 1987A, a supernova in the Large Magellanic Cloud observed in February 1987. Other well-known supernova remnants include the Crab Nebula; Tycho, the remnant of SN 1572, named after Tycho Brahe, who recorded the brightness of its original explosion; and Kepler, the remnant of SN 1604, named after Johannes Kepler. The youngest known remnant in the Milky Way is G1.9+0.3, discovered in the Galactic Center.

== Stages ==
An SNR passes through the following stages as it expands:

1. Free expansion of the ejecta, until they sweep up their own weight in circumstellar or interstellar medium. This can last tens to a few hundred years, depending on the density of the surrounding gas.
2. Sweeping up of a shell of shocked circumstellar and interstellar gas. This begins the Sedov-Taylor phase, which can be well modeled by a self-similar analytic solution (see Taylor–von Neumann–Sedov blast wave). Strong X-ray emission traces the strong shock waves and hot shocked gas.
3. Cooling of the shell, to form a thin (< 1 pc), dense (1 to 100 million atoms per cubic metre) shell surrounding the hot (a few million kelvin) interior. This is the pressure-driven snowplow phase. The shell can be clearly seen in optical emission from recombining ionized hydrogen and ionized oxygen atoms.
4. Cooling of the interior. The dense shell continues to expand from its own momentum. This stage is best seen in the radio emission from neutral hydrogen atoms.
5. Merging with the surrounding interstellar medium. When the supernova remnant slows to the speed of the random velocities in the surrounding medium, after roughly 30,000 years, it will merge into the general turbulent flow, contributing its remaining kinetic energy to the turbulence.
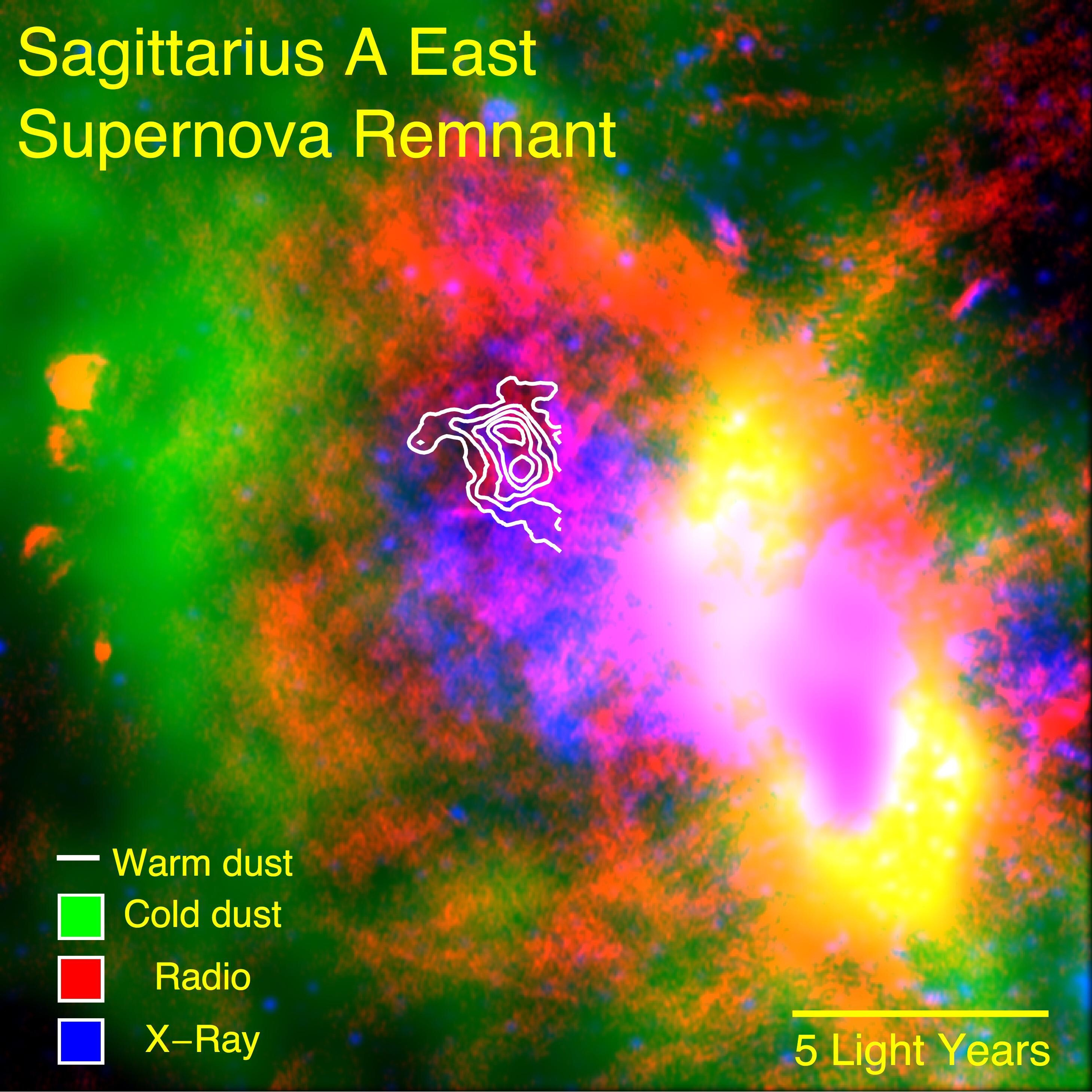
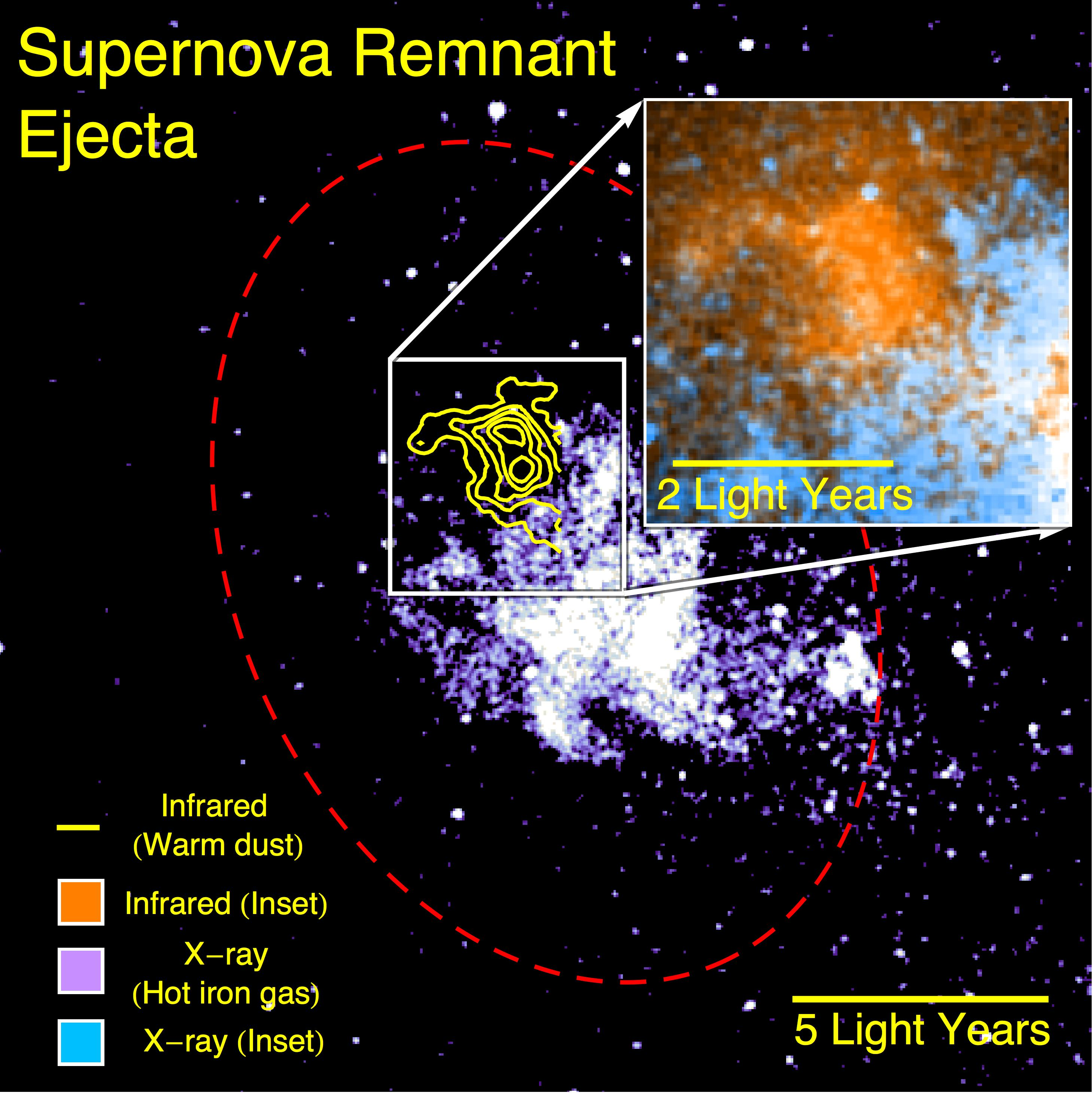
Supernova remnant ejecta producing planet-forming material

== Types of supernova remnant ==
There are three types of supernova remnants:

- Shell-like, such as Cassiopeia A
- Composite, in which a shell contains a central pulsar wind nebula, such as G11.2-0.3 or G21.5-0.9.
- Mixed-morphology (also called "thermal composite") remnants, in which central thermal X-ray emission is seen, enclosed by a radio shell. The thermal X-rays are primarily from swept-up interstellar material, rather than supernova ejecta. Examples of this class include the SNRs W28 and W44. (Confusingly, W44 additionally contains a pulsar and pulsar wind nebula; so it is simultaneously both a "classic" composite and a thermal composite.)
Supernova remnants

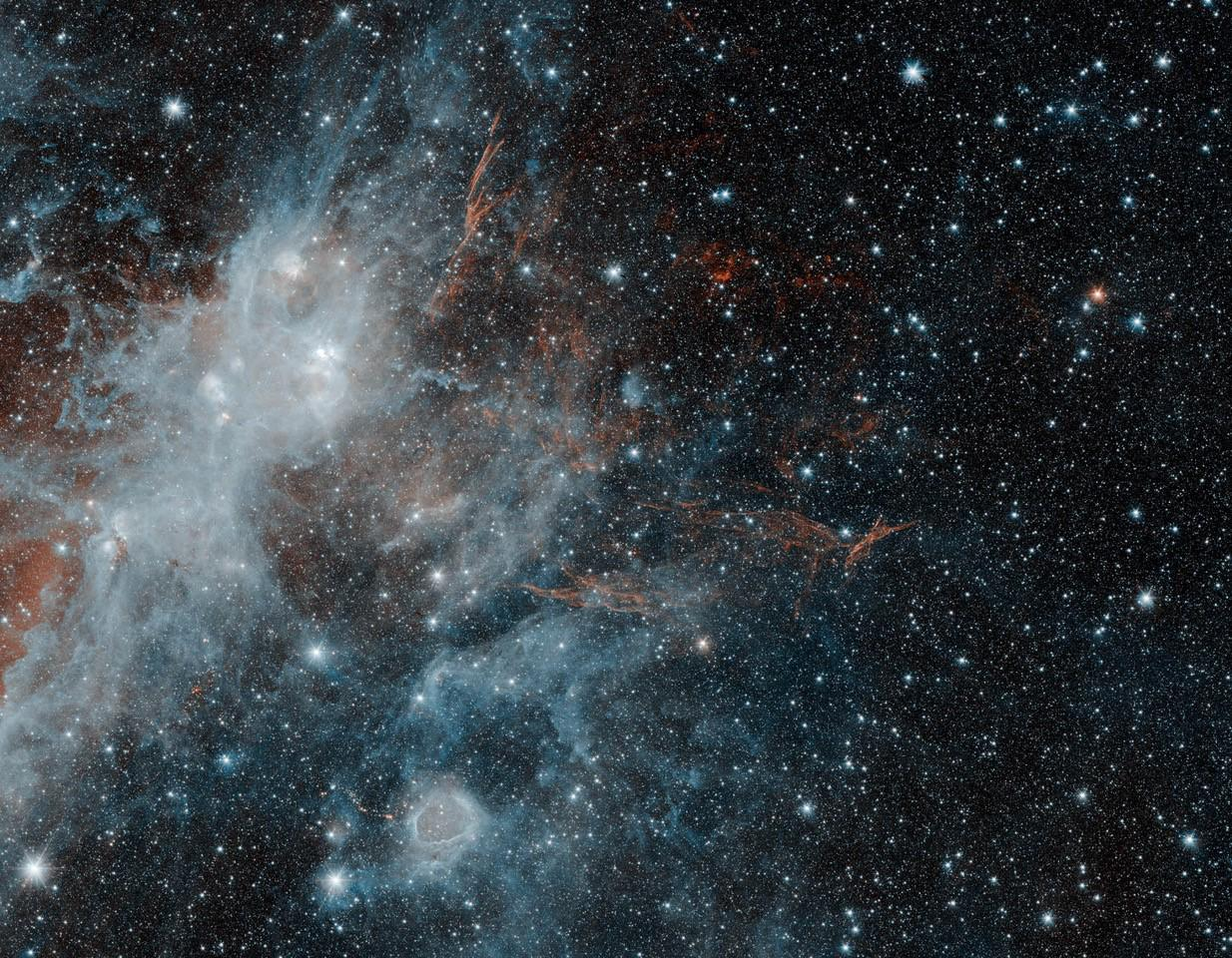
HBH 3 (Spitzer Space Telescope; August 2, 2018)

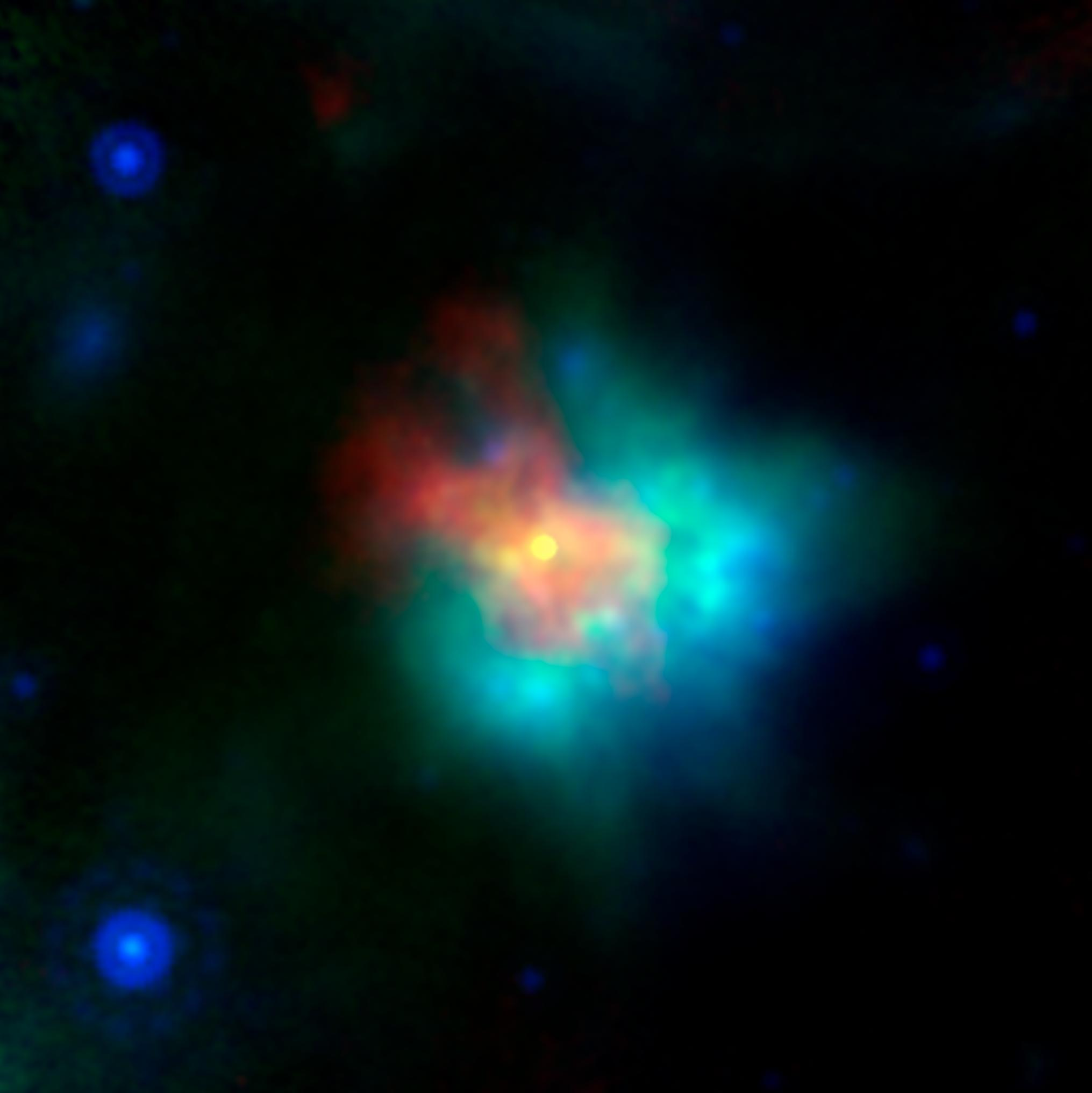
G54.1+0.3 (November 16, 2018)

Remnants which could only be created by significantly higher ejection energies than a standard supernova are called hypernova remnants, after the high-energy hypernova explosion that is assumed to have created them.

== Origin of cosmic rays ==
Supernova remnants are considered the major source of galactic cosmic rays. The connection between cosmic rays and supernovas was first suggested by Walter Baade and Fritz Zwicky in 1934. Vitaly Ginzburg and Sergei Syrovatskii in 1964 remarked that if the efficiency of cosmic ray acceleration in supernova remnants is about 10 percent, then the cosmic ray losses of the Milky Way are compensated. This hypothesis is supported by a specific mechanism, "shock wave acceleration", based on Enrico Fermi's ideas, which is still under development.

In 1949, Fermi proposed a model for the acceleration of cosmic rays through particle collisions with magnetic clouds in the interstellar medium. This process, known as the "Second Order Fermi Mechanism", increases particle energy during head-on collisions, resulting in a steady gain in energy. A later model for Fermi Acceleration was proposed by a powerful shock front moving through space. Particles that repeatedly cross the shock front can gain significant energy. This became known as the "First Order Fermi Mechanism".

Supernova remnants can provide the energetic shock fronts needed to generate ultra-high-energy cosmic rays. Observations of the SN 1006 remnant in X-rays have shown synchrotron emission consistent with it being a source of cosmic rays. However, for energies higher than about 10^{18} eV, a different mechanism is required as supernova remnants cannot provide sufficient energy.

It is still unclear whether supernova remnants accelerate cosmic rays up to PeV energies. The future telescope CTA will help to answer this question.

== See also ==
- List of supernova remnants
- Local Bubble
- Nova remnant
- Planetary nebula
- Sigma-D relation
- Superbubble
