= List of minor planets: 501001–502000 =

The following is a partial list of minor planets, running from minor-planet number 501001 through 502000, inclusive. The primary data for this and other partial lists is based on JPL's "Small-Body Orbital Elements" and data available from the Minor Planet Center. Critical list information is also provided by the MPC, unless otherwise specified from Lowell Observatory. A detailed description of the table's columns and additional sources are given on the main page including a complete list of every page in this series, and a statistical break-up on the dynamical classification of minor planets.

Also see the summary list of all named bodies in numerical and alphabetical order, and the corresponding naming citations for the number range of this particular list. New namings may only be added to this list after official publication, as the preannouncement of names is condemned by the Working Group for Small Bodies Nomenclature of the International Astronomical Union.

Near-Earth obj.	MBA (inner)	MBA (outer)	Centaur
Mars-crosser	MBA (middle)	Jupiter trojan	Trans-Neptunian obj.
Unclassified

== 501001–501100 ==
Designation			Discovery			Properties		Ref
Permanent	Provisional	Named after	Date	Site	Discoverer(s)	Category	Diam.	Ref
501001	2013 RD_{26}	—	September 3, 2013	Catalina	CSS	·	970 m	MPC · JPL
501002	2013 RG_{28}	—	September 4, 2013	Mount Lemmon	Mount Lemmon Survey	·	1.7 km	MPC · JPL
501003	2013 RL_{28}	—	September 4, 2013	Mount Lemmon	Mount Lemmon Survey	KOR	1.1 km	MPC · JPL
501004	2013 RE_{29}	—	September 4, 2013	Mount Lemmon	Mount Lemmon Survey	·	1.4 km	MPC · JPL
501005	2013 RR_{31}	—	September 3, 2013	Catalina	CSS	EUN	1.0 km	MPC · JPL
501006	2013 RT_{31}	—	August 8, 2013	Kitt Peak	Spacewatch	RAF	690 m	MPC · JPL
501007	2013 RD_{33}	—	October 15, 2009	La Sagra	OAM	(5)	1.2 km	MPC · JPL
501008	2013 RV_{33}	—	January 9, 2010	WISE	WISE	KON	2.1 km	MPC · JPL
501009	2013 RN_{36}	—	October 12, 2009	Mount Lemmon	Mount Lemmon Survey	WIT	920 m	MPC · JPL
501010	2013 RW_{36}	—	September 3, 2013	Kitt Peak	Spacewatch	·	960 m	MPC · JPL
501011	2013 RL_{38}	—	September 3, 2013	Mount Lemmon	Mount Lemmon Survey	·	1.4 km	MPC · JPL
501012	2013 RB_{39}	—	September 19, 2009	Kitt Peak	Spacewatch	(5)	980 m	MPC · JPL
501013	2013 RO_{39}	—	September 3, 2013	Mount Lemmon	Mount Lemmon Survey	·	1.7 km	MPC · JPL
501014	2013 RS_{42}	—	March 13, 2012	Mount Lemmon	Mount Lemmon Survey	·	1.1 km	MPC · JPL
501015	2013 RR_{45}	—	October 30, 2005	Kitt Peak	Spacewatch	·	1.2 km	MPC · JPL
501016	2013 RO_{46}	—	September 18, 2009	Kitt Peak	Spacewatch	(5)	690 m	MPC · JPL
501017	2013 RB_{47}	—	November 19, 2009	Mount Lemmon	Mount Lemmon Survey	·	1.2 km	MPC · JPL
501018	2013 RE_{47}	—	September 29, 2009	Mount Lemmon	Mount Lemmon Survey	·	1.2 km	MPC · JPL
501019	2013 RK_{53}	—	September 5, 2013	Kitt Peak	Spacewatch	·	1.9 km	MPC · JPL
501020	2013 RG_{54}	—	February 7, 2011	Mount Lemmon	Mount Lemmon Survey	MAS	700 m	MPC · JPL
501021	2013 RW_{55}	—	January 20, 2010	WISE	WISE	·	1.3 km	MPC · JPL
501022	2013 RY_{56}	—	October 26, 2009	Kitt Peak	Spacewatch	·	1.2 km	MPC · JPL
501023	2013 RE_{57}	—	September 16, 2009	Kitt Peak	Spacewatch	·	1.0 km	MPC · JPL
501024	2013 RJ_{60}	—	September 8, 2013	Haleakala	Pan-STARRS 1	·	1.9 km	MPC · JPL
501025	2013 RP_{60}	—	March 1, 2011	Catalina	CSS	EUN	1.4 km	MPC · JPL
501026	2013 RA_{63}	—	October 27, 2009	Mount Lemmon	Mount Lemmon Survey	·	1.2 km	MPC · JPL
501027	2013 RT_{63}	—	September 1, 2013	Haleakala	Pan-STARRS 1	·	1.2 km	MPC · JPL
501028	2013 RX_{64}	—	October 7, 2000	Kitt Peak	Spacewatch	·	1.6 km	MPC · JPL
501029	2013 RL_{67}	—	March 13, 2007	Mount Lemmon	Mount Lemmon Survey	·	1.1 km	MPC · JPL
501030	2013 RF_{68}	—	February 5, 2011	Haleakala	Pan-STARRS 1	·	1.2 km	MPC · JPL
501031	2013 RP_{70}	—	September 21, 2009	Kitt Peak	Spacewatch	·	1.0 km	MPC · JPL
501032	2013 RQ_{70}	—	October 8, 2004	Kitt Peak	Spacewatch	·	1.3 km	MPC · JPL
501033	2013 RS_{70}	—	February 8, 2011	Mount Lemmon	Mount Lemmon Survey	NYS	1.0 km	MPC · JPL
501034	2013 RV_{70}	—	September 3, 2013	Kitt Peak	Spacewatch	PHO	770 m	MPC · JPL
501035	2013 RY_{70}	—	September 20, 2009	Mount Lemmon	Mount Lemmon Survey	·	1.6 km	MPC · JPL
501036	2013 RA_{71}	—	October 7, 2004	Kitt Peak	Spacewatch	·	1.5 km	MPC · JPL
501037	2013 RT_{71}	—	October 23, 2009	Mount Lemmon	Mount Lemmon Survey	·	1.4 km	MPC · JPL
501038	2013 RX_{72}	—	September 1, 2013	Mount Lemmon	Mount Lemmon Survey	WIT	790 m	MPC · JPL
501039	2013 RL_{74}	—	September 23, 2009	Mount Lemmon	Mount Lemmon Survey	·	780 m	MPC · JPL
501040	2013 RF_{78}	—	November 4, 2005	Mount Lemmon	Mount Lemmon Survey	·	860 m	MPC · JPL
501041	2013 RK_{79}	—	October 24, 2009	Kitt Peak	Spacewatch	·	980 m	MPC · JPL
501042	2013 RD_{82}	—	February 13, 2011	Mount Lemmon	Mount Lemmon Survey	·	1.4 km	MPC · JPL
501043	2013 RM_{82}	—	September 30, 2005	Kitt Peak	Spacewatch	·	600 m	MPC · JPL
501044	2013 RG_{83}	—	September 13, 2013	Kitt Peak	Spacewatch	EUN	1.2 km	MPC · JPL
501045	2013 RK_{86}	—	September 5, 2013	Kitt Peak	Spacewatch	MAR	1.1 km	MPC · JPL
501046	2013 RJ_{87}	—	April 12, 2011	Kitt Peak	Spacewatch	·	1.7 km	MPC · JPL
501047	2013 RN_{94}	—	November 22, 2005	Kitt Peak	Spacewatch	·	890 m	MPC · JPL
501048	2013 RQ_{94}	—	February 10, 2011	Mount Lemmon	Mount Lemmon Survey	·	1.3 km	MPC · JPL
501049	2013 RT_{94}	—	November 10, 2009	Mount Lemmon	Mount Lemmon Survey	·	1.5 km	MPC · JPL
501050	2013 RD_{95}	—	October 23, 2009	Kitt Peak	Spacewatch	(5)	830 m	MPC · JPL
501051	2013 RU_{96}	—	October 7, 2005	Catalina	CSS	·	910 m	MPC · JPL
501052	2013 RM_{97}	—	September 10, 2013	Haleakala	Pan-STARRS 1	·	1.7 km	MPC · JPL
501053	2013 RQ_{97}	—	September 4, 2013	Catalina	CSS	·	1.2 km	MPC · JPL
501054	2013 SA	—	September 14, 2013	Mount Lemmon	Mount Lemmon Survey	(5)	1.3 km	MPC · JPL
501055	2013 SP_{8}	—	September 16, 2009	Kitt Peak	Spacewatch	·	1.2 km	MPC · JPL
501056	2013 SO_{14}	—	September 1, 2013	Mount Lemmon	Mount Lemmon Survey	·	1.3 km	MPC · JPL
501057	2013 SQ_{15}	—	September 21, 2009	Mount Lemmon	Mount Lemmon Survey	·	1.1 km	MPC · JPL
501058	2013 SH_{20}	—	February 14, 2010	WISE	WISE	·	1.4 km	MPC · JPL
501059	2013 SU_{25}	—	August 15, 2009	La Sagra	OAM	·	1.1 km	MPC · JPL
501060	2013 SO_{27}	—	October 30, 2009	Mount Lemmon	Mount Lemmon Survey	·	990 m	MPC · JPL
501061	2013 SX_{27}	—	February 7, 2010	WISE	WISE	·	2.2 km	MPC · JPL
501062	2013 SJ_{28}	—	January 27, 2006	Anderson Mesa	LONEOS	·	1.4 km	MPC · JPL
501063	2013 SG_{29}	—	May 21, 2012	Haleakala	Pan-STARRS 1	·	3.1 km	MPC · JPL
501064	2013 SH_{30}	—	November 9, 2009	Mount Lemmon	Mount Lemmon Survey	·	1.3 km	MPC · JPL
501065	2013 SC_{32}	—	March 4, 2011	Mount Lemmon	Mount Lemmon Survey	·	1.2 km	MPC · JPL
501066	2013 SZ_{32}	—	September 17, 2009	Kitt Peak	Spacewatch	·	1.1 km	MPC · JPL
501067	2013 SY_{37}	—	September 28, 2009	Kitt Peak	Spacewatch	·	1.3 km	MPC · JPL
501068	2013 SD_{39}	—	November 22, 2009	Mount Lemmon	Mount Lemmon Survey	·	1.0 km	MPC · JPL
501069	2013 SC_{41}	—	March 6, 2011	Mount Lemmon	Mount Lemmon Survey	·	1.2 km	MPC · JPL
501070	2013 SL_{42}	—	November 12, 2005	Kitt Peak	Spacewatch	·	830 m	MPC · JPL
501071	2013 SW_{45}	—	September 12, 2009	Catalina	CSS	·	1.1 km	MPC · JPL
501072	2013 SX_{45}	—	November 18, 2009	Kitt Peak	Spacewatch	·	1.5 km	MPC · JPL
501073	2013 SA_{46}	—	August 15, 2013	Haleakala	Pan-STARRS 1	·	1.3 km	MPC · JPL
501074	2013 ST_{47}	—	September 5, 2000	Socorro	LINEAR	·	1.3 km	MPC · JPL
501075	2013 SU_{49}	—	September 28, 2013	Mount Lemmon	Mount Lemmon Survey	·	1.0 km	MPC · JPL
501076	2013 SM_{50}	—	September 14, 2013	Mount Lemmon	Mount Lemmon Survey	MAR	1.2 km	MPC · JPL
501077	2013 SY_{50}	—	January 31, 2006	Kitt Peak	Spacewatch	·	1.7 km	MPC · JPL
501078	2013 SQ_{53}	—	September 1, 2013	Mount Lemmon	Mount Lemmon Survey	·	1.1 km	MPC · JPL
501079	2013 SE_{54}	—	September 2, 2008	La Sagra	OAM	·	2.8 km	MPC · JPL
501080	2013 SK_{55}	—	October 12, 2009	La Sagra	OAM	·	800 m	MPC · JPL
501081	2013 SN_{55}	—	October 5, 2004	Anderson Mesa	LONEOS	ADE	1.6 km	MPC · JPL
501082	2013 SM_{56}	—	August 27, 2013	Haleakala	Pan-STARRS 1	MAR	1.2 km	MPC · JPL
501083	2013 SJ_{57}	—	January 25, 2006	Kitt Peak	Spacewatch	·	1.4 km	MPC · JPL
501084	2013 SG_{58}	—	February 11, 2004	Palomar	NEAT	TIR	3.0 km	MPC · JPL
501085	2013 SS_{62}	—	March 6, 2011	Mount Lemmon	Mount Lemmon Survey	·	1.2 km	MPC · JPL
501086	2013 SN_{64}	—	January 25, 2011	Catalina	CSS	·	1.8 km	MPC · JPL
501087	2013 SN_{66}	—	January 28, 2011	Catalina	CSS	PHO	900 m	MPC · JPL
501088	2013 SR_{68}	—	November 1, 2005	Mount Lemmon	Mount Lemmon Survey	·	1.3 km	MPC · JPL
501089	2013 SK_{71}	—	October 24, 2009	Catalina	CSS	·	1.6 km	MPC · JPL
501090	2013 SY_{71}	—	September 5, 2013	Catalina	CSS	EUN	860 m	MPC · JPL
501091	2013 SL_{72}	—	November 21, 2009	Mount Lemmon	Mount Lemmon Survey	·	1.5 km	MPC · JPL
501092	2013 SM_{72}	—	September 1, 2013	Mount Lemmon	Mount Lemmon Survey	·	1.1 km	MPC · JPL
501093	2013 SP_{72}	—	September 27, 2005	Kitt Peak	Spacewatch	(5)	840 m	MPC · JPL
501094	2013 SW_{76}	—	November 12, 2005	Kitt Peak	Spacewatch	·	1.3 km	MPC · JPL
501095	2013 SH_{78}	—	September 28, 2013	Haleakala	Pan-STARRS 1	·	1.5 km	MPC · JPL
501096	2013 SN_{81}	—	September 14, 2013	Mount Lemmon	Mount Lemmon Survey	·	1.3 km	MPC · JPL
501097	2013 SO_{81}	—	September 29, 2013	Mount Lemmon	Mount Lemmon Survey	EOS	1.8 km	MPC · JPL
501098	2013 SP_{81}	—	September 29, 2013	Mount Lemmon	Mount Lemmon Survey	·	1.4 km	MPC · JPL
501099	2013 ST_{81}	—	September 29, 2013	Mount Lemmon	Mount Lemmon Survey	·	2.0 km	MPC · JPL
501100	2013 SV_{81}	—	September 12, 2013	Mount Lemmon	Mount Lemmon Survey	RAF	1.1 km	MPC · JPL

== 501101–501200 ==
back to top

Designation			Discovery			Properties		Ref
Permanent	Provisional	Named after	Date	Site	Discoverer(s)	Category	Diam.	Ref
501101	2013 SZ_{82}	—	January 7, 2006	Mount Lemmon	Mount Lemmon Survey	·	1.3 km	MPC · JPL
501102	2013 SB_{83}	—	December 21, 2005	Kitt Peak	Spacewatch	(5)	1.0 km	MPC · JPL
501103	2013 SF_{83}	—	September 30, 2013	Mount Lemmon	Mount Lemmon Survey	BRA	1.7 km	MPC · JPL
501104	2013 SG_{85}	—	March 29, 2012	Haleakala	Pan-STARRS 1	·	1.3 km	MPC · JPL
501105	2013 SA_{87}	—	September 23, 2013	Calar Alto-CASADO	Hellmich, S., Mottola, S.	cubewano (hot)	180 km	MPC · JPL
501106	2013 TN_{1}	—	September 3, 2013	Kitt Peak	Spacewatch	·	1.1 km	MPC · JPL
501107	2013 TF_{2}	—	March 9, 2007	Mount Lemmon	Mount Lemmon Survey	·	1.8 km	MPC · JPL
501108	2013 TF_{3}	—	December 30, 2005	Kitt Peak	Spacewatch	MAR	980 m	MPC · JPL
501109	2013 TE_{7}	—	September 28, 2013	Catalina	CSS	·	1.4 km	MPC · JPL
501110	2013 TJ_{7}	—	November 6, 2005	Kitt Peak	Spacewatch	·	1.6 km	MPC · JPL
501111	2013 TE_{8}	—	September 7, 2004	Socorro	LINEAR	·	1.7 km	MPC · JPL
501112	2013 TN_{8}	—	September 29, 2005	Mount Lemmon	Mount Lemmon Survey	·	1.5 km	MPC · JPL
501113	2013 TL_{10}	—	March 2, 2011	Mount Lemmon	Mount Lemmon Survey	·	1.3 km	MPC · JPL
501114	2013 TG_{12}	—	August 20, 2009	La Sagra	OAM	·	1.3 km	MPC · JPL
501115	2013 TU_{12}	—	August 30, 2009	Kitt Peak	Spacewatch	·	1.4 km	MPC · JPL
501116	2013 TP_{13}	—	November 25, 2005	Kitt Peak	Spacewatch	·	960 m	MPC · JPL
501117	2013 TA_{15}	—	May 8, 2008	Kitt Peak	Spacewatch	(5)	970 m	MPC · JPL
501118	2013 TM_{18}	—	November 9, 2009	Kitt Peak	Spacewatch	(5)	920 m	MPC · JPL
501119	2013 TK_{19}	—	September 15, 2013	Haleakala	Pan-STARRS 1	·	1.9 km	MPC · JPL
501120	2013 TR_{20}	—	January 23, 2006	Kitt Peak	Spacewatch	·	1.2 km	MPC · JPL
501121	2013 TN_{22}	—	October 27, 2005	Kitt Peak	Spacewatch	·	720 m	MPC · JPL
501122	2013 TV_{23}	—	April 2, 2011	Mount Lemmon	Mount Lemmon Survey	·	2.3 km	MPC · JPL
501123	2013 TX_{23}	—	October 1, 2013	Kitt Peak	Spacewatch	·	970 m	MPC · JPL
501124	2013 TH_{24}	—	September 27, 2008	Mount Lemmon	Mount Lemmon Survey	·	1.9 km	MPC · JPL
501125	2013 TU_{25}	—	November 9, 2009	Kitt Peak	Spacewatch	(5)	1.0 km	MPC · JPL
501126	2013 TO_{26}	—	September 30, 2005	Mount Lemmon	Mount Lemmon Survey	·	800 m	MPC · JPL
501127	2013 TO_{31}	—	January 23, 2006	Kitt Peak	Spacewatch	·	1.8 km	MPC · JPL
501128	2013 TX_{31}	—	October 12, 2009	Mount Lemmon	Mount Lemmon Survey	·	1.2 km	MPC · JPL
501129	2013 TL_{32}	—	September 20, 2009	Mount Lemmon	Mount Lemmon Survey	·	1.1 km	MPC · JPL
501130	2013 TW_{32}	—	October 7, 2005	Mount Lemmon	Mount Lemmon Survey	·	1.1 km	MPC · JPL
501131	2013 TE_{33}	—	September 23, 2000	Socorro	LINEAR	EUN	1.0 km	MPC · JPL
501132 Runkel	2013 TJ_{35}	Runkel	March 25, 2011	Haleakala	Pan-STARRS 1	·	1.7 km	MPC · JPL
501133	2013 TN_{35}	—	December 26, 2005	Mount Lemmon	Mount Lemmon Survey	(5)	930 m	MPC · JPL
501134	2013 TO_{35}	—	March 1, 2010	WISE	WISE	·	960 m	MPC · JPL
501135	2013 TE_{39}	—	April 22, 2007	Kitt Peak	Spacewatch	·	1.6 km	MPC · JPL
501136	2013 TO_{40}	—	October 25, 2008	Mount Lemmon	Mount Lemmon Survey	KOR	1.2 km	MPC · JPL
501137	2013 TJ_{43}	—	April 4, 2011	Mount Lemmon	Mount Lemmon Survey	·	1.8 km	MPC · JPL
501138	2013 TM_{43}	—	October 27, 2009	Mount Lemmon	Mount Lemmon Survey	EUN	930 m	MPC · JPL
501139	2013 TX_{44}	—	November 26, 2009	Mount Lemmon	Mount Lemmon Survey	·	1.5 km	MPC · JPL
501140	2013 TT_{52}	—	October 4, 2013	Kitt Peak	Spacewatch	·	1.5 km	MPC · JPL
501141	2013 TS_{53}	—	October 12, 2009	Mount Lemmon	Mount Lemmon Survey	·	950 m	MPC · JPL
501142	2013 TV_{53}	—	September 10, 2004	Socorro	LINEAR	·	1.6 km	MPC · JPL
501143	2013 TB_{54}	—	October 22, 2009	Mount Lemmon	Mount Lemmon Survey	(5)	1.1 km	MPC · JPL
501144	2013 TT_{55}	—	November 21, 2009	Kitt Peak	Spacewatch	(5)	1.3 km	MPC · JPL
501145	2013 TL_{61}	—	April 1, 2008	Kitt Peak	Spacewatch	·	1.5 km	MPC · JPL
501146	2013 TT_{61}	—	October 26, 2008	Kitt Peak	Spacewatch	·	3.9 km	MPC · JPL
501147	2013 TM_{62}	—	November 6, 1996	Kitt Peak	Spacewatch	·	1.0 km	MPC · JPL
501148	2013 TO_{64}	—	September 13, 2013	Mount Lemmon	Mount Lemmon Survey	·	1.5 km	MPC · JPL
501149	2013 TR_{65}	—	July 16, 2013	Haleakala	Pan-STARRS 1	·	1.6 km	MPC · JPL
501150	2013 TV_{65}	—	February 14, 2010	WISE	WISE	·	2.6 km	MPC · JPL
501151	2013 TK_{70}	—	April 1, 2008	Kitt Peak	Spacewatch	·	1.1 km	MPC · JPL
501152	2013 TX_{71}	—	September 1, 2013	Mount Lemmon	Mount Lemmon Survey	·	1.1 km	MPC · JPL
501153	2013 TG_{72}	—	November 17, 2009	Kitt Peak	Spacewatch	·	1.0 km	MPC · JPL
501154	2013 TM_{72}	—	September 19, 2009	Kitt Peak	Spacewatch	RAF	770 m	MPC · JPL
501155	2013 TP_{72}	—	September 11, 2004	Kitt Peak	Spacewatch	·	1.2 km	MPC · JPL
501156	2013 TU_{73}	—	September 21, 2009	Kitt Peak	Spacewatch	·	1.3 km	MPC · JPL
501157	2013 TZ_{73}	—	December 15, 2009	Catalina	CSS	·	1.6 km	MPC · JPL
501158	2013 TM_{77}	—	January 21, 2010	WISE	WISE	·	1.3 km	MPC · JPL
501159	2013 TQ_{77}	—	October 5, 2013	Haleakala	Pan-STARRS 1	·	1.4 km	MPC · JPL
501160	2013 TD_{79}	—	March 12, 2007	Kitt Peak	Spacewatch	HNS	1.2 km	MPC · JPL
501161	2013 TH_{79}	—	November 9, 2009	Mount Lemmon	Mount Lemmon Survey	(5)	850 m	MPC · JPL
501162	2013 TW_{79}	—	September 30, 2013	Catalina	CSS	H	500 m	MPC · JPL
501163	2013 TF_{80}	—	September 6, 2013	Kitt Peak	Spacewatch	·	1.0 km	MPC · JPL
501164	2013 TU_{82}	—	July 31, 2009	Kitt Peak	Spacewatch	·	1.3 km	MPC · JPL
501165	2013 TR_{83}	—	October 10, 1996	Kitt Peak	Spacewatch	·	1.1 km	MPC · JPL
501166	2013 TB_{84}	—	March 28, 2011	Mount Lemmon	Mount Lemmon Survey	·	1.6 km	MPC · JPL
501167	2013 TK_{84}	—	September 3, 2008	Kitt Peak	Spacewatch	·	1.7 km	MPC · JPL
501168	2013 TL_{84}	—	November 16, 2009	Kitt Peak	Spacewatch	·	830 m	MPC · JPL
501169	2013 TJ_{89}	—	October 16, 2001	Kitt Peak	Spacewatch	(5)	870 m	MPC · JPL
501170	2013 TO_{89}	—	November 27, 2009	Mount Lemmon	Mount Lemmon Survey	·	1.2 km	MPC · JPL
501171	2013 TX_{89}	—	October 1, 2013	Kitt Peak	Spacewatch	·	1.7 km	MPC · JPL
501172	2013 TC_{93}	—	May 20, 2012	Mount Lemmon	Mount Lemmon Survey	·	1.4 km	MPC · JPL
501173	2013 TM_{93}	—	June 16, 2012	Mount Lemmon	Mount Lemmon Survey	·	1.5 km	MPC · JPL
501174	2013 TN_{94}	—	November 9, 2009	Catalina	CSS	·	1.1 km	MPC · JPL
501175	2013 TV_{94}	—	August 24, 2008	Kitt Peak	Spacewatch	·	1.8 km	MPC · JPL
501176	2013 TS_{95}	—	November 18, 2009	Kitt Peak	Spacewatch	·	1.0 km	MPC · JPL
501177	2013 TK_{96}	—	April 27, 2012	Haleakala	Pan-STARRS 1	·	1.2 km	MPC · JPL
501178	2013 TC_{99}	—	October 2, 2013	Kitt Peak	Spacewatch	·	2.2 km	MPC · JPL
501179	2013 TM_{99}	—	October 27, 2009	La Sagra	OAM	·	880 m	MPC · JPL
501180	2013 TU_{99}	—	July 20, 2013	Haleakala	Pan-STARRS 1	·	2.2 km	MPC · JPL
501181	2013 TQ_{102}	—	January 31, 2006	Kitt Peak	Spacewatch	·	1.4 km	MPC · JPL
501182	2013 TO_{106}	—	March 27, 2012	Kitt Peak	Spacewatch	·	1.3 km	MPC · JPL
501183	2013 TP_{106}	—	April 5, 2011	Mount Lemmon	Mount Lemmon Survey	·	1.6 km	MPC · JPL
501184	2013 TT_{108}	—	December 10, 2009	Mount Lemmon	Mount Lemmon Survey	·	1.0 km	MPC · JPL
501185	2013 TW_{108}	—	September 13, 2013	Mount Lemmon	Mount Lemmon Survey	·	1.2 km	MPC · JPL
501186	2013 TH_{109}	—	July 16, 2013	Haleakala	Pan-STARRS 1	EUN	1.3 km	MPC · JPL
501187	2013 TM_{109}	—	October 3, 2013	Kitt Peak	Spacewatch	·	1.7 km	MPC · JPL
501188	2013 TG_{110}	—	October 3, 2013	Kitt Peak	Spacewatch	·	2.0 km	MPC · JPL
501189	2013 TT_{110}	—	January 12, 2010	Mount Lemmon	Mount Lemmon Survey	·	1.4 km	MPC · JPL
501190	2013 TX_{112}	—	October 3, 2013	Haleakala	Pan-STARRS 1	WIT	980 m	MPC · JPL
501191	2013 TP_{113}	—	September 14, 2013	Mount Lemmon	Mount Lemmon Survey	·	1.5 km	MPC · JPL
501192	2013 TS_{114}	—	September 14, 2013	Mount Lemmon	Mount Lemmon Survey	HNS	1.0 km	MPC · JPL
501193	2013 TJ_{115}	—	May 15, 2012	Haleakala	Pan-STARRS 1	·	1.6 km	MPC · JPL
501194	2013 TM_{116}	—	April 2, 2011	Mount Lemmon	Mount Lemmon Survey	·	1.9 km	MPC · JPL
501195	2013 TX_{123}	—	December 24, 2005	Kitt Peak	Spacewatch	·	670 m	MPC · JPL
501196	2013 TH_{124}	—	April 4, 2011	Mount Lemmon	Mount Lemmon Survey	·	1.4 km	MPC · JPL
501197	2013 TL_{124}	—	November 26, 2005	Kitt Peak	Spacewatch	·	530 m	MPC · JPL
501198	2013 TO_{126}	—	November 8, 2009	Catalina	CSS	(5)	1.2 km	MPC · JPL
501199	2013 TK_{127}	—	April 1, 2011	Mount Lemmon	Mount Lemmon Survey	PAD	1.5 km	MPC · JPL
501200	2013 TK_{128}	—	February 27, 2012	Haleakala	Pan-STARRS 1	·	1.0 km	MPC · JPL

== 501201–501300 ==
back to top

Designation			Discovery			Properties		Ref
Permanent	Provisional	Named after	Date	Site	Discoverer(s)	Category	Diam.	Ref
501201	2013 TH_{130}	—	February 7, 2011	Mount Lemmon	Mount Lemmon Survey	·	1.6 km	MPC · JPL
501202	2013 TU_{134}	—	February 1, 2006	Kitt Peak	Spacewatch	·	810 m	MPC · JPL
501203	2013 TB_{136}	—	September 23, 2000	Socorro	LINEAR	·	2.0 km	MPC · JPL
501204	2013 TE_{136}	—	February 27, 2006	Mount Lemmon	Mount Lemmon Survey	·	1.6 km	MPC · JPL
501205	2013 TT_{136}	—	October 2, 2009	Mount Lemmon	Mount Lemmon Survey	·	770 m	MPC · JPL
501206	2013 TZ_{136}	—	October 3, 2013	Kitt Peak	Spacewatch	MAR	1.1 km	MPC · JPL
501207	2013 TO_{141}	—	September 15, 2013	Kitt Peak	Spacewatch	HOF	2.1 km	MPC · JPL
501208	2013 TS_{141}	—	October 11, 2004	Kitt Peak	Spacewatch	·	1.8 km	MPC · JPL
501209	2013 TV_{141}	—	September 4, 2013	Mount Lemmon	Mount Lemmon Survey	HOF	2.1 km	MPC · JPL
501210	2013 TF_{142}	—	October 18, 2009	Mount Lemmon	Mount Lemmon Survey	·	1.1 km	MPC · JPL
501211	2013 TQ_{143}	—	November 20, 2009	Kitt Peak	Spacewatch	·	1.2 km	MPC · JPL
501212	2013 TB_{145}	—	December 20, 2009	Mount Lemmon	Mount Lemmon Survey	·	2.1 km	MPC · JPL
501213	2013 TS_{145}	—	October 5, 2013	Haleakala	Pan-STARRS 1	·	1.6 km	MPC · JPL
501214	2013 TC_{146}	—	October 5, 2013	Kitt Peak	Research and Education Collaborative Occultation Network	centaur	263 km	MPC · JPL
501215	2013 TZ_{153}	—	November 25, 2005	Kitt Peak	Spacewatch	·	1.2 km	MPC · JPL
501216	2013 UW	—	March 5, 2010	Catalina	CSS	·	1.3 km	MPC · JPL
501217	2013 UY_{1}	—	October 20, 2013	Haleakala	Pan-STARRS 1	H	480 m	MPC · JPL
501218	2013 UZ_{2}	—	December 10, 2004	Kitt Peak	Spacewatch	·	2.7 km	MPC · JPL
501219	2013 UP_{3}	—	September 22, 2009	Catalina	CSS	·	2.3 km	MPC · JPL
501220	2013 UB_{6}	—	October 11, 2013	Catalina	CSS	·	1.8 km	MPC · JPL
501221	2013 UX_{7}	—	April 2, 2011	Haleakala	Pan-STARRS 1	·	2.6 km	MPC · JPL
501222	2013 US_{9}	—	September 29, 2009	Mount Lemmon	Mount Lemmon Survey	·	1.2 km	MPC · JPL
501223	2013 UU_{12}	—	October 13, 2013	Mount Lemmon	Mount Lemmon Survey	HOF	2.2 km	MPC · JPL
501224	2013 UU_{13}	—	December 24, 2005	Kitt Peak	Spacewatch	JUN	710 m	MPC · JPL
501225	2013 UY_{13}	—	September 17, 2013	Mount Lemmon	Mount Lemmon Survey	·	1.5 km	MPC · JPL
501226	2013 UH_{14}	—	November 10, 2009	Catalina	CSS	EUN	960 m	MPC · JPL
501227	2013 UO_{14}	—	December 29, 2005	Catalina	CSS	·	1.4 km	MPC · JPL
501228	2013 VL_{1}	—	September 6, 2013	Mount Lemmon	Mount Lemmon Survey	·	1.8 km	MPC · JPL
501229	2013 VO_{1}	—	November 27, 2009	Mount Lemmon	Mount Lemmon Survey	(5)	1.4 km	MPC · JPL
501230	2013 VB_{3}	—	September 17, 2013	Mount Lemmon	Mount Lemmon Survey	MAR	1.1 km	MPC · JPL
501231	2013 VS_{3}	—	September 6, 2013	Mount Lemmon	Mount Lemmon Survey	ADE	1.5 km	MPC · JPL
501232	2013 VT_{3}	—	November 22, 2005	Catalina	CSS	·	1.5 km	MPC · JPL
501233	2013 VS_{4}	—	December 29, 2005	Mount Lemmon	Mount Lemmon Survey	·	1.4 km	MPC · JPL
501234	2013 VK_{6}	—	November 27, 2009	Mount Lemmon	Mount Lemmon Survey	·	2.5 km	MPC · JPL
501235	2013 VM_{6}	—	October 6, 2013	Mount Lemmon	Mount Lemmon Survey	·	1.2 km	MPC · JPL
501236	2013 VY_{6}	—	October 12, 2013	XuYi	PMO NEO Survey Program	·	2.5 km	MPC · JPL
501237	2013 VR_{7}	—	September 19, 2008	Kitt Peak	Spacewatch	·	1.4 km	MPC · JPL
501238	2013 VG_{8}	—	October 1, 2000	Socorro	LINEAR	·	1.2 km	MPC · JPL
501239	2013 VK_{10}	—	November 16, 2009	Socorro	LINEAR	·	1.7 km	MPC · JPL
501240	2013 VN_{10}	—	October 2, 2013	Kitt Peak	Spacewatch	·	1.2 km	MPC · JPL
501241	2013 VA_{11}	—	April 26, 2011	Mount Lemmon	Mount Lemmon Survey	·	1.5 km	MPC · JPL
501242	2013 VO_{12}	—	October 3, 2013	Catalina	CSS	·	1.4 km	MPC · JPL
501243	2013 VG_{13}	—	November 9, 2013	Mount Lemmon	Mount Lemmon Survey	APO	160 m	MPC · JPL
501244	2013 VA_{15}	—	July 16, 2013	Haleakala	Pan-STARRS 1	·	1.5 km	MPC · JPL
501245	2013 VW_{15}	—	July 20, 2013	Haleakala	Pan-STARRS 1	AGN	1.3 km	MPC · JPL
501246	2013 VC_{16}	—	October 12, 2009	Mount Lemmon	Mount Lemmon Survey	KON	1.8 km	MPC · JPL
501247	2013 VK_{16}	—	November 8, 2009	Kitt Peak	Spacewatch	·	1.2 km	MPC · JPL
501248	2013 VR_{18}	—	October 22, 2009	Catalina	CSS	·	1.4 km	MPC · JPL
501249	2013 VR_{19}	—	October 3, 2013	Kitt Peak	Spacewatch	BRG	1.2 km	MPC · JPL
501250	2013 VT_{20}	—	September 23, 2000	Socorro	LINEAR	·	1.3 km	MPC · JPL
501251	2013 VX_{20}	—	February 15, 2010	Catalina	CSS	·	2.0 km	MPC · JPL
501252	2013 VX_{21}	—	October 8, 2013	XuYi	PMO NEO Survey Program	(5)	1.2 km	MPC · JPL
501253	2013 VF_{22}	—	January 7, 2010	Kitt Peak	Spacewatch	JUN	980 m	MPC · JPL
501254	2013 VG_{22}	—	October 26, 2009	Mount Lemmon	Mount Lemmon Survey	·	3.0 km	MPC · JPL
501255	2013 VH_{22}	—	September 24, 2000	Socorro	LINEAR	(1547)	1.4 km	MPC · JPL
501256	2013 WA	—	January 28, 2006	Catalina	CSS	·	2.1 km	MPC · JPL
501257	2013 WN_{1}	—	November 10, 2009	Kitt Peak	Spacewatch	·	1.0 km	MPC · JPL
501258	2013 WA_{2}	—	April 21, 2012	Mount Lemmon	Mount Lemmon Survey	·	1.7 km	MPC · JPL
501259	2013 WY_{2}	—	September 17, 2013	Mount Lemmon	Mount Lemmon Survey	·	1.8 km	MPC · JPL
501260	2013 WY_{3}	—	November 2, 2013	Mount Lemmon	Mount Lemmon Survey	HNS	1.5 km	MPC · JPL
501261	2013 WB_{6}	—	October 30, 2013	Haleakala	Pan-STARRS 1	·	1.3 km	MPC · JPL
501262	2013 WU_{6}	—	February 22, 2006	Kitt Peak	Spacewatch	·	1.8 km	MPC · JPL
501263	2013 WT_{9}	—	October 30, 2013	Haleakala	Pan-STARRS 1	·	1.5 km	MPC · JPL
501264	2013 WF_{11}	—	October 23, 2004	Kitt Peak	Spacewatch	HNS	1.1 km	MPC · JPL
501265	2013 WE_{12}	—	November 26, 2013	XuYi	PMO NEO Survey Program	EUN	1.3 km	MPC · JPL
501266	2013 WJ_{13}	—	October 26, 2013	Mount Lemmon	Mount Lemmon Survey	·	1.7 km	MPC · JPL
501267	2013 WV_{13}	—	May 1, 2011	Haleakala	Pan-STARRS 1	·	1.9 km	MPC · JPL
501268	2013 WG_{14}	—	November 27, 2013	Haleakala	Pan-STARRS 1	·	1.6 km	MPC · JPL
501269	2013 WE_{15}	—	October 26, 2013	Mount Lemmon	Mount Lemmon Survey	EOS	1.8 km	MPC · JPL
501270	2013 WE_{19}	—	November 27, 2013	Haleakala	Pan-STARRS 1	·	2.7 km	MPC · JPL
501271	2013 WE_{26}	—	September 14, 2013	Catalina	CSS	·	1.6 km	MPC · JPL
501272	2013 WC_{29}	—	November 18, 2009	Mount Lemmon	Mount Lemmon Survey	·	1.4 km	MPC · JPL
501273	2013 WZ_{33}	—	October 8, 2008	Kitt Peak	Spacewatch	HOF	2.2 km	MPC · JPL
501274	2013 WT_{34}	—	September 21, 2008	Kitt Peak	Spacewatch	AGN	1 km	MPC · JPL
501275	2013 WN_{37}	—	December 14, 2004	Kitt Peak	Spacewatch	·	2.0 km	MPC · JPL
501276	2013 WH_{41}	—	October 6, 2008	Mount Lemmon	Mount Lemmon Survey	·	1.4 km	MPC · JPL
501277	2013 WJ_{41}	—	August 13, 2012	Kitt Peak	Spacewatch	·	2.5 km	MPC · JPL
501278	2013 WZ_{41}	—	January 6, 2010	Kitt Peak	Spacewatch	·	1.8 km	MPC · JPL
501279	2013 WA_{43}	—	October 31, 2013	Mount Lemmon	Mount Lemmon Survey	·	3.1 km	MPC · JPL
501280	2013 WO_{43}	—	September 21, 2004	Kitt Peak	Spacewatch	·	1.3 km	MPC · JPL
501281	2013 WJ_{46}	—	July 14, 2013	Haleakala	Pan-STARRS 1	·	1.9 km	MPC · JPL
501282	2013 WM_{46}	—	October 25, 2013	Catalina	CSS	·	1.7 km	MPC · JPL
501283	2013 WS_{46}	—	January 6, 2010	Catalina	CSS	·	1.9 km	MPC · JPL
501284	2013 WV_{46}	—	September 28, 2013	Mount Lemmon	Mount Lemmon Survey	·	1.5 km	MPC · JPL
501285	2013 WY_{46}	—	November 19, 2009	Mount Lemmon	Mount Lemmon Survey	MRX	960 m	MPC · JPL
501286	2013 WK_{53}	—	February 25, 2011	Mount Lemmon	Mount Lemmon Survey	(5)	2.0 km	MPC · JPL
501287	2013 WR_{54}	—	June 6, 2010	WISE	WISE	·	2.9 km	MPC · JPL
501288	2013 WW_{54}	—	February 2, 2005	Kitt Peak	Spacewatch	615	1.5 km	MPC · JPL
501289	2013 WY_{54}	—	November 21, 2009	Mount Lemmon	Mount Lemmon Survey	·	1.4 km	MPC · JPL
501290	2013 WB_{56}	—	November 1, 2013	Kitt Peak	Spacewatch	·	2.0 km	MPC · JPL
501291	2013 WH_{57}	—	November 27, 2009	Mount Lemmon	Mount Lemmon Survey	(5)	1.3 km	MPC · JPL
501292	2013 WY_{57}	—	October 5, 2000	Socorro	LINEAR	·	1.8 km	MPC · JPL
501293	2013 WA_{59}	—	November 16, 2009	Mount Lemmon	Mount Lemmon Survey	·	1.3 km	MPC · JPL
501294	2013 WZ_{59}	—	January 8, 2010	Kitt Peak	Spacewatch	AEO	900 m	MPC · JPL
501295	2013 WL_{62}	—	January 1, 2009	Mount Lemmon	Mount Lemmon Survey	·	1.5 km	MPC · JPL
501296	2013 WB_{63}	—	September 23, 2000	Socorro	LINEAR	·	1.6 km	MPC · JPL
501297	2013 WF_{63}	—	September 2, 2000	Anderson Mesa	LONEOS	·	1.3 km	MPC · JPL
501298	2013 WV_{63}	—	December 1, 2005	Mount Lemmon	Mount Lemmon Survey	·	1.5 km	MPC · JPL
501299	2013 WB_{68}	—	May 12, 2012	Haleakala	Pan-STARRS 1	·	1.7 km	MPC · JPL
501300	2013 WW_{68}	—	January 22, 2006	Mount Lemmon	Mount Lemmon Survey	·	990 m	MPC · JPL

== 501301–501400 ==
back to top

Designation			Discovery			Properties		Ref
Permanent	Provisional	Named after	Date	Site	Discoverer(s)	Category	Diam.	Ref
501301	2013 WZ_{68}	—	October 2, 2013	Kitt Peak	Spacewatch	·	2.0 km	MPC · JPL
501302	2013 WD_{69}	—	September 19, 2008	Kitt Peak	Spacewatch	·	1.6 km	MPC · JPL
501303	2013 WA_{70}	—	January 11, 2010	Mount Lemmon	Mount Lemmon Survey	·	1.5 km	MPC · JPL
501304	2013 WM_{70}	—	November 4, 1999	Kitt Peak	Spacewatch	·	1.6 km	MPC · JPL
501305	2013 WS_{71}	—	October 2, 2008	Mount Lemmon	Mount Lemmon Survey	·	1.4 km	MPC · JPL
501306	2013 WF_{72}	—	May 11, 2007	Mount Lemmon	Mount Lemmon Survey	·	2.2 km	MPC · JPL
501307	2013 WD_{74}	—	December 17, 2009	Kitt Peak	Spacewatch	·	1.7 km	MPC · JPL
501308	2013 WW_{78}	—	November 10, 2009	Mount Lemmon	Mount Lemmon Survey	(5)	1.2 km	MPC · JPL
501309	2013 WF_{83}	—	November 27, 2013	Haleakala	Pan-STARRS 1	·	1.6 km	MPC · JPL
501310	2013 WS_{85}	—	February 21, 2006	Mount Lemmon	Mount Lemmon Survey	·	930 m	MPC · JPL
501311	2013 WW_{85}	—	November 21, 2009	Mount Lemmon	Mount Lemmon Survey	·	1.4 km	MPC · JPL
501312	2013 WJ_{86}	—	July 13, 2013	Haleakala	Pan-STARRS 1	·	2.0 km	MPC · JPL
501313	2013 WJ_{91}	—	August 6, 2012	Haleakala	Pan-STARRS 1	·	1.9 km	MPC · JPL
501314	2013 WV_{98}	—	November 9, 2013	Haleakala	Pan-STARRS 1	·	1.8 km	MPC · JPL
501315	2013 WD_{103}	—	December 25, 2005	Kitt Peak	Spacewatch	(5)	1.1 km	MPC · JPL
501316	2013 WT_{103}	—	December 30, 2005	Catalina	CSS	HNS	1.5 km	MPC · JPL
501317	2013 WU_{103}	—	September 27, 2008	Mount Lemmon	Mount Lemmon Survey	ADE	1.9 km	MPC · JPL
501318	2013 WB_{104}	—	November 28, 2013	Mount Lemmon	Mount Lemmon Survey	·	2.2 km	MPC · JPL
501319	2013 WF_{104}	—	September 14, 2013	Catalina	CSS	·	2.0 km	MPC · JPL
501320	2013 WA_{106}	—	May 1, 2011	Haleakala	Pan-STARRS 1	GEF	1.7 km	MPC · JPL
501321	2013 WP_{106}	—	September 12, 2004	Socorro	LINEAR	·	1.2 km	MPC · JPL
501322	2013 WD_{108}	—	January 2, 2006	Mount Lemmon	Mount Lemmon Survey	·	1.0 km	MPC · JPL
501323	2013 WV_{108}	—	August 23, 2004	Kitt Peak	Spacewatch	·	1.3 km	MPC · JPL
501324	2013 XK_{2}	—	January 6, 2010	Kitt Peak	Spacewatch	MRX	820 m	MPC · JPL
501325	2013 XD_{3}	—	October 24, 2013	Kitt Peak	Spacewatch	MAR	1.1 km	MPC · JPL
501326	2013 XG_{5}	—	January 7, 2006	Mount Lemmon	Mount Lemmon Survey	·	1.3 km	MPC · JPL
501327	2013 XN_{5}	—	December 4, 2008	Mount Lemmon	Mount Lemmon Survey	·	1.9 km	MPC · JPL
501328	2013 XL_{6}	—	October 28, 2013	Mount Lemmon	Mount Lemmon Survey	TEL	1.5 km	MPC · JPL
501329	2013 XR_{8}	—	November 28, 2013	Kitt Peak	Spacewatch	JUN	1.1 km	MPC · JPL
501330	2013 XP_{10}	—	December 17, 2009	Mount Lemmon	Mount Lemmon Survey	·	1.5 km	MPC · JPL
501331	2013 XW_{10}	—	October 20, 1999	Kitt Peak	Spacewatch	·	1.5 km	MPC · JPL
501332	2013 XK_{12}	—	November 28, 2013	Mount Lemmon	Mount Lemmon Survey	·	1.7 km	MPC · JPL
501333	2013 XJ_{14}	—	November 27, 2000	Kitt Peak	Spacewatch	·	1.2 km	MPC · JPL
501334	2013 XS_{16}	—	October 24, 2008	Mount Lemmon	Mount Lemmon Survey	PAD	1.2 km	MPC · JPL
501335	2013 XQ_{18}	—	November 28, 2013	Mount Lemmon	Mount Lemmon Survey	·	1.9 km	MPC · JPL
501336	2013 XT_{20}	—	November 24, 2009	Catalina	CSS	·	2.7 km	MPC · JPL
501337	2013 XM_{23}	—	December 13, 2013	Mount Lemmon	Mount Lemmon Survey	·	2.0 km	MPC · JPL
501338	2013 YK	—	October 26, 2013	Catalina	CSS	·	1.9 km	MPC · JPL
501339	2013 YV_{1}	—	October 8, 2012	Haleakala	Pan-STARRS 1	·	2.5 km	MPC · JPL
501340	2013 YS_{4}	—	December 23, 2013	Mount Lemmon	Mount Lemmon Survey	TIR	3.3 km	MPC · JPL
501341	2013 YG_{7}	—	November 28, 2013	Mount Lemmon	Mount Lemmon Survey	·	2.4 km	MPC · JPL
501342	2013 YC_{10}	—	December 24, 2013	Mount Lemmon	Mount Lemmon Survey	·	3.2 km	MPC · JPL
501343	2013 YD_{10}	—	January 14, 2001	Kitt Peak	Spacewatch	·	1.8 km	MPC · JPL
501344	2013 YH_{10}	—	June 15, 2005	Mount Lemmon	Mount Lemmon Survey	·	3.1 km	MPC · JPL
501345	2013 YC_{11}	—	March 1, 2005	Kitt Peak	Spacewatch	·	1.8 km	MPC · JPL
501346	2013 YQ_{11}	—	December 2, 2004	Kitt Peak	Spacewatch	·	1.3 km	MPC · JPL
501347	2013 YN_{12}	—	November 29, 2013	Mount Lemmon	Mount Lemmon Survey	·	3.5 km	MPC · JPL
501348	2013 YS_{13}	—	December 25, 2013	Mount Lemmon	Mount Lemmon Survey	·	3.2 km	MPC · JPL
501349	2013 YE_{15}	—	November 14, 2013	Mount Lemmon	Mount Lemmon Survey	·	1.3 km	MPC · JPL
501350	2013 YO_{15}	—	November 27, 2013	Haleakala	Pan-STARRS 1	·	1.4 km	MPC · JPL
501351	2013 YV_{19}	—	August 6, 2011	Haleakala	Pan-STARRS 1	·	5.7 km	MPC · JPL
501352	2013 YM_{20}	—	May 21, 2012	Haleakala	Pan-STARRS 1	·	1.4 km	MPC · JPL
501353	2013 YC_{25}	—	November 20, 2000	Kitt Peak	Spacewatch	·	1.1 km	MPC · JPL
501354	2013 YQ_{26}	—	December 22, 2008	Kitt Peak	Spacewatch	·	1.7 km	MPC · JPL
501355	2013 YJ_{30}	—	August 17, 2012	Haleakala	Pan-STARRS 1	·	2.0 km	MPC · JPL
501356	2013 YU_{30}	—	October 24, 2007	Mount Lemmon	Mount Lemmon Survey	·	2.6 km	MPC · JPL
501357	2013 YC_{31}	—	December 18, 2009	Mount Lemmon	Mount Lemmon Survey	·	1.4 km	MPC · JPL
501358	2013 YV_{32}	—	November 2, 2013	Mount Lemmon	Mount Lemmon Survey	·	1.7 km	MPC · JPL
501359	2013 YZ_{32}	—	November 30, 2008	Kitt Peak	Spacewatch	·	1.9 km	MPC · JPL
501360	2013 YD_{33}	—	October 21, 1995	Kitt Peak	Spacewatch	·	1.2 km	MPC · JPL
501361	2013 YN_{33}	—	December 26, 2013	Mount Lemmon	Mount Lemmon Survey	615	1.4 km	MPC · JPL
501362	2013 YY_{33}	—	December 26, 2013	Mount Lemmon	Mount Lemmon Survey	TIR	2.4 km	MPC · JPL
501363	2013 YE_{36}	—	December 26, 2013	Haleakala	Pan-STARRS 1	EUN	1.2 km	MPC · JPL
501364	2013 YO_{40}	—	August 11, 2012	Haleakala	Pan-STARRS 1	(194)	1.7 km	MPC · JPL
501365	2013 YA_{42}	—	November 11, 2004	Kitt Peak	Spacewatch	·	1.4 km	MPC · JPL
501366	2013 YS_{42}	—	December 26, 2013	Kitt Peak	Spacewatch	·	3.1 km	MPC · JPL
501367	2013 YQ_{43}	—	September 19, 2003	Kitt Peak	Spacewatch	·	1.9 km	MPC · JPL
501368	2013 YU_{44}	—	December 26, 2013	Kitt Peak	Spacewatch	·	2.8 km	MPC · JPL
501369	2013 YD_{45}	—	October 18, 2012	Mount Lemmon	Mount Lemmon Survey	·	2.7 km	MPC · JPL
501370	2013 YN_{45}	—	October 20, 2012	Haleakala	Pan-STARRS 1	·	2.4 km	MPC · JPL
501371	2013 YJ_{47}	—	October 30, 2008	Mount Lemmon	Mount Lemmon Survey	·	2.7 km	MPC · JPL
501372	2013 YS_{47}	—	December 13, 2013	Mount Lemmon	Mount Lemmon Survey	·	2.1 km	MPC · JPL
501373	2013 YX_{47}	—	November 8, 2013	Mount Lemmon	Mount Lemmon Survey	·	2.9 km	MPC · JPL
501374	2013 YW_{48}	—	September 26, 2008	Mount Lemmon	Mount Lemmon Survey	·	1.8 km	MPC · JPL
501375	2013 YT_{50}	—	February 13, 2010	Catalina	CSS	·	1.3 km	MPC · JPL
501376	2013 YS_{51}	—	January 1, 1998	Kitt Peak	Spacewatch	·	2.7 km	MPC · JPL
501377	2013 YX_{53}	—	November 28, 2013	Mount Lemmon	Mount Lemmon Survey	·	2.0 km	MPC · JPL
501378	2013 YE_{56}	—	November 18, 2007	Mount Lemmon	Mount Lemmon Survey	·	2.9 km	MPC · JPL
501379	2013 YH_{59}	—	October 8, 2012	Haleakala	Pan-STARRS 1	·	3.4 km	MPC · JPL
501380	2013 YS_{59}	—	December 27, 2013	Kitt Peak	Spacewatch	·	1.6 km	MPC · JPL
501381	2013 YG_{64}	—	October 8, 2012	Haleakala	Pan-STARRS 1	VER	3.4 km	MPC · JPL
501382	2013 YH_{65}	—	December 10, 2013	Mount Lemmon	Mount Lemmon Survey	·	2.9 km	MPC · JPL
501383	2013 YM_{65}	—	March 16, 2009	Mount Lemmon	Mount Lemmon Survey	LIX	4.3 km	MPC · JPL
501384	2013 YC_{66}	—	December 4, 2013	XuYi	PMO NEO Survey Program	·	1.4 km	MPC · JPL
501385	2013 YT_{68}	—	October 17, 2012	Haleakala	Pan-STARRS 1	·	2.0 km	MPC · JPL
501386	2013 YU_{68}	—	December 30, 2013	Mount Lemmon	Mount Lemmon Survey	·	3.2 km	MPC · JPL
501387	2013 YA_{69}	—	February 1, 2009	Kitt Peak	Spacewatch	EOS	1.8 km	MPC · JPL
501388	2013 YS_{74}	—	September 26, 2012	Mount Lemmon	Mount Lemmon Survey	·	1.9 km	MPC · JPL
501389	2013 YD_{75}	—	October 8, 2012	Haleakala	Pan-STARRS 1	·	3.2 km	MPC · JPL
501390	2013 YM_{75}	—	December 26, 2013	Mount Lemmon	Mount Lemmon Survey	·	2.8 km	MPC · JPL
501391	2013 YR_{75}	—	December 26, 2013	Mount Lemmon	Mount Lemmon Survey	EOS	1.8 km	MPC · JPL
501392	2013 YW_{75}	—	December 26, 2013	Mount Lemmon	Mount Lemmon Survey	·	1.9 km	MPC · JPL
501393	2013 YF_{76}	—	October 7, 2012	Haleakala	Pan-STARRS 1	·	1.9 km	MPC · JPL
501394	2013 YQ_{78}	—	October 8, 2012	Haleakala	Pan-STARRS 1	·	3.2 km	MPC · JPL
501395	2013 YE_{83}	—	October 15, 2012	Kitt Peak	Spacewatch	·	4.0 km	MPC · JPL
501396	2013 YH_{83}	—	September 6, 2008	Catalina	CSS	·	1.4 km	MPC · JPL
501397	2013 YR_{83}	—	August 6, 2008	Siding Spring	SSS	JUN	1.2 km	MPC · JPL
501398	2013 YF_{90}	—	December 28, 2013	Kitt Peak	Spacewatch	·	2.7 km	MPC · JPL
501399	2013 YH_{92}	—	December 22, 2003	Kitt Peak	Spacewatch	·	1.4 km	MPC · JPL
501400	2013 YQ_{92}	—	November 27, 2013	Kitt Peak	Spacewatch	·	2.2 km	MPC · JPL

== 501401–501500 ==
back to top

Designation			Discovery			Properties		Ref
Permanent	Provisional	Named after	Date	Site	Discoverer(s)	Category	Diam.	Ref
501401	2013 YO_{93}	—	December 30, 2013	Kitt Peak	Spacewatch	·	2.5 km	MPC · JPL
501402	2013 YU_{93}	—	October 8, 2012	Haleakala	Pan-STARRS 1	·	4.0 km	MPC · JPL
501403	2013 YG_{94}	—	October 15, 2007	Mount Lemmon	Mount Lemmon Survey	·	1.7 km	MPC · JPL
501404	2013 YE_{95}	—	December 30, 2013	Kitt Peak	Spacewatch	EOS	1.9 km	MPC · JPL
501405	2013 YU_{96}	—	October 20, 2012	Haleakala	Pan-STARRS 1	EOS	2.7 km	MPC · JPL
501406	2013 YD_{107}	—	January 20, 2009	Kitt Peak	Spacewatch	·	2.0 km	MPC · JPL
501407	2013 YY_{108}	—	September 18, 2012	Mount Lemmon	Mount Lemmon Survey	EOS	1.6 km	MPC · JPL
501408	2013 YL_{109}	—	May 22, 2006	Mount Lemmon	Mount Lemmon Survey	·	2.8 km	MPC · JPL
501409	2013 YJ_{111}	—	September 28, 2008	Mount Lemmon	Mount Lemmon Survey	·	2.0 km	MPC · JPL
501410	2013 YQ_{113}	—	October 18, 2012	Haleakala	Pan-STARRS 1	·	2.4 km	MPC · JPL
501411	2013 YT_{116}	—	December 30, 2013	Mount Lemmon	Mount Lemmon Survey	·	1.9 km	MPC · JPL
501412	2013 YV_{120}	—	January 29, 2009	Catalina	CSS	·	4.2 km	MPC · JPL
501413	2013 YN_{124}	—	November 18, 2007	Mount Lemmon	Mount Lemmon Survey	HYG	2.4 km	MPC · JPL
501414	2013 YA_{125}	—	October 6, 2012	Haleakala	Pan-STARRS 1	·	2.3 km	MPC · JPL
501415	2013 YS_{128}	—	December 7, 2013	Haleakala	Pan-STARRS 1	·	2.2 km	MPC · JPL
501416	2013 YP_{130}	—	March 18, 2010	Mount Lemmon	Mount Lemmon Survey	·	1.5 km	MPC · JPL
501417	2013 YQ_{130}	—	December 31, 2013	Mount Lemmon	Mount Lemmon Survey	·	1.6 km	MPC · JPL
501418	2013 YD_{131}	—	August 1, 2011	Haleakala	Pan-STARRS 1	·	2.9 km	MPC · JPL
501419	2013 YJ_{131}	—	October 14, 2012	Mount Lemmon	Mount Lemmon Survey	CYB	2.8 km	MPC · JPL
501420	2013 YD_{132}	—	August 27, 2006	Kitt Peak	Spacewatch	·	2.9 km	MPC · JPL
501421	2013 YK_{132}	—	November 12, 2012	Haleakala	Pan-STARRS 1	·	4.0 km	MPC · JPL
501422	2013 YG_{133}	—	September 9, 2007	Kitt Peak	Spacewatch	·	1.3 km	MPC · JPL
501423	2013 YS_{138}	—	January 18, 2009	Kitt Peak	Spacewatch	ARM	3.2 km	MPC · JPL
501424	2013 YU_{139}	—	December 11, 2004	Kitt Peak	Spacewatch	·	1.2 km	MPC · JPL
501425	2013 YW_{139}	—	October 6, 2012	Haleakala	Pan-STARRS 1	·	3.2 km	MPC · JPL
501426	2013 YQ_{141}	—	October 6, 2008	Catalina	CSS	·	1.9 km	MPC · JPL
501427	2013 YP_{146}	—	February 19, 2009	Mount Lemmon	Mount Lemmon Survey	·	2.5 km	MPC · JPL
501428	2013 YF_{149}	—	October 17, 2001	Socorro	LINEAR	·	3.4 km	MPC · JPL
501429	2013 YH_{149}	—	December 11, 2013	Haleakala	Pan-STARRS 1	TIR	2.6 km	MPC · JPL
501430	2013 YD_{150}	—	January 11, 2010	Mount Lemmon	Mount Lemmon Survey	·	1.3 km	MPC · JPL
501431	2013 YL_{150}	—	February 13, 2010	Catalina	CSS	·	1.9 km	MPC · JPL
501432	2013 YP_{150}	—	October 19, 2007	Catalina	CSS	·	3.6 km	MPC · JPL
501433	2014 AV	—	January 1, 2014	Haleakala	Pan-STARRS 1	·	2.7 km	MPC · JPL
501434	2014 AA_{1}	—	October 29, 2008	Mount Lemmon	Mount Lemmon Survey	·	1.5 km	MPC · JPL
501435	2014 AO_{4}	—	December 13, 2013	Mount Lemmon	Mount Lemmon Survey	VER	2.7 km	MPC · JPL
501436	2014 AG_{10}	—	November 24, 2008	Mount Lemmon	Mount Lemmon Survey	·	3.5 km	MPC · JPL
501437	2014 AA_{19}	—	November 5, 2007	Mount Lemmon	Mount Lemmon Survey	·	1.8 km	MPC · JPL
501438	2014 AO_{19}	—	January 1, 2014	Kitt Peak	Spacewatch	·	2.8 km	MPC · JPL
501439	2014 AC_{20}	—	November 2, 2013	Mount Lemmon	Mount Lemmon Survey	·	1.9 km	MPC · JPL
501440	2014 AW_{22}	—	February 10, 2010	WISE	WISE	·	3.1 km	MPC · JPL
501441	2014 AQ_{23}	—	October 6, 2012	Haleakala	Pan-STARRS 1	·	3.2 km	MPC · JPL
501442	2014 AW_{23}	—	October 10, 2007	Mount Lemmon	Mount Lemmon Survey	·	1.7 km	MPC · JPL
501443	2014 AB_{27}	—	August 6, 2010	WISE	WISE	EUP	4.7 km	MPC · JPL
501444	2014 AG_{27}	—	October 23, 2012	Haleakala	Pan-STARRS 1	·	4.6 km	MPC · JPL
501445	2014 AH_{27}	—	March 2, 2010	WISE	WISE	·	4.9 km	MPC · JPL
501446	2014 AJ_{28}	—	September 4, 2008	Kitt Peak	Spacewatch	(5)	1.2 km	MPC · JPL
501447	2014 AW_{29}	—	December 5, 2008	Mount Lemmon	Mount Lemmon Survey	·	2.5 km	MPC · JPL
501448	2014 AX_{33}	—	January 1, 2009	Mount Lemmon	Mount Lemmon Survey	EOS	1.5 km	MPC · JPL
501449	2014 AA_{35}	—	November 28, 2013	Mount Lemmon	Mount Lemmon Survey	EOS	1.8 km	MPC · JPL
501450	2014 AM_{36}	—	September 5, 2008	Kitt Peak	Spacewatch	·	1.7 km	MPC · JPL
501451	2014 AP_{38}	—	October 16, 2012	Mount Lemmon	Mount Lemmon Survey	·	2.3 km	MPC · JPL
501452	2014 AM_{40}	—	November 8, 2013	Mount Lemmon	Mount Lemmon Survey	·	2.8 km	MPC · JPL
501453	2014 AZ_{40}	—	January 10, 2008	Mount Lemmon	Mount Lemmon Survey	CYB	3.5 km	MPC · JPL
501454	2014 AL_{41}	—	November 3, 2007	Mount Lemmon	Mount Lemmon Survey	·	2.0 km	MPC · JPL
501455	2014 AW_{42}	—	December 1, 2008	Mount Lemmon	Mount Lemmon Survey	EOS	3.6 km	MPC · JPL
501456	2014 AK_{43}	—	June 6, 2010	Kitt Peak	Spacewatch	·	3.8 km	MPC · JPL
501457	2014 AY_{45}	—	December 14, 2004	Catalina	CSS	·	1.8 km	MPC · JPL
501458	2014 AU_{46}	—	September 26, 2012	Haleakala	Pan-STARRS 1	·	2.5 km	MPC · JPL
501459	2014 AL_{47}	—	December 4, 2007	Mount Lemmon	Mount Lemmon Survey	THM	1.9 km	MPC · JPL
501460	2014 AS_{47}	—	December 30, 2013	Kitt Peak	Spacewatch	EOS	1.8 km	MPC · JPL
501461	2014 AS_{49}	—	January 29, 2009	Mount Lemmon	Mount Lemmon Survey	·	2.1 km	MPC · JPL
501462	2014 BD_{7}	—	January 25, 2009	Kitt Peak	Spacewatch	·	1.8 km	MPC · JPL
501463	2014 BE_{10}	—	September 15, 2012	Catalina	CSS	·	3.5 km	MPC · JPL
501464	2014 BC_{11}	—	January 21, 2014	Kitt Peak	Spacewatch	EOS	1.8 km	MPC · JPL
501465	2014 BY_{14}	—	November 24, 2008	Kitt Peak	Spacewatch	·	2.2 km	MPC · JPL
501466	2014 BR_{16}	—	November 1, 2008	Mount Lemmon	Mount Lemmon Survey	MRX	960 m	MPC · JPL
501467	2014 BZ_{17}	—	August 23, 2011	La Sagra	OAM	·	4.0 km	MPC · JPL
501468	2014 BU_{18}	—	October 19, 2012	Mount Lemmon	Mount Lemmon Survey	·	3.1 km	MPC · JPL
501469	2014 BV_{19}	—	March 1, 2009	Kitt Peak	Spacewatch	EOS	2.0 km	MPC · JPL
501470	2014 BM_{20}	—	December 15, 2007	Catalina	CSS	·	3.1 km	MPC · JPL
501471	2014 BR_{30}	—	September 27, 2006	Kitt Peak	Spacewatch	EOS	1.6 km	MPC · JPL
501472	2014 BE_{36}	—	August 9, 2011	Haleakala	Pan-STARRS 1	·	3.6 km	MPC · JPL
501473	2014 BJ_{39}	—	January 7, 1998	Kitt Peak	Spacewatch	·	2.8 km	MPC · JPL
501474	2014 BQ_{44}	—	December 5, 2007	Kitt Peak	Spacewatch	·	3.1 km	MPC · JPL
501475	2014 BQ_{48}	—	February 24, 2009	Mount Lemmon	Mount Lemmon Survey	·	2.8 km	MPC · JPL
501476	2014 BV_{52}	—	January 27, 2003	Kitt Peak	Spacewatch	ELF	3.9 km	MPC · JPL
501477	2014 BW_{54}	—	December 5, 2007	Kitt Peak	Spacewatch	·	2.6 km	MPC · JPL
501478	2014 BT_{58}	—	December 3, 2008	Kitt Peak	Spacewatch	EOS	2.2 km	MPC · JPL
501479	2014 BD_{60}	—	June 11, 2012	Haleakala	Pan-STARRS 1	H	620 m	MPC · JPL
501480	2014 BD_{62}	—	September 18, 2006	Kitt Peak	Spacewatch	·	3.8 km	MPC · JPL
501481	2014 BW_{62}	—	October 7, 2012	Haleakala	Pan-STARRS 1	·	1.6 km	MPC · JPL
501482	2014 CO_{2}	—	October 20, 2012	Haleakala	Pan-STARRS 1	EOS	2.1 km	MPC · JPL
501483	2014 CU_{2}	—	March 9, 2003	Anderson Mesa	LONEOS	·	6.1 km	MPC · JPL
501484	2014 CR_{4}	—	November 8, 2007	Kitt Peak	Spacewatch	·	2.0 km	MPC · JPL
501485	2014 CW_{4}	—	January 30, 2009	Mount Lemmon	Mount Lemmon Survey	EOS	2.0 km	MPC · JPL
501486	2014 CK_{5}	—	October 21, 2007	Mount Lemmon	Mount Lemmon Survey	·	2.2 km	MPC · JPL
501487	2014 CL_{6}	—	January 3, 2014	Kitt Peak	Spacewatch	·	3.0 km	MPC · JPL
501488	2014 CN_{12}	—	August 27, 2006	Kitt Peak	Spacewatch	·	2.6 km	MPC · JPL
501489	2014 CW_{12}	—	November 7, 2012	Haleakala	Pan-STARRS 1	·	2.7 km	MPC · JPL
501490	2014 CJ_{16}	—	October 18, 2012	Haleakala	Pan-STARRS 1	·	2.5 km	MPC · JPL
501491	2014 CM_{17}	—	October 21, 2012	Haleakala	Pan-STARRS 1	·	2.7 km	MPC · JPL
501492	2014 DW	—	January 9, 2014	Mount Lemmon	Mount Lemmon Survey	·	2.7 km	MPC · JPL
501493	2014 DP_{1}	—	January 18, 2005	Catalina	CSS	·	1.4 km	MPC · JPL
501494	2014 DV_{1}	—	November 6, 2013	Haleakala	Pan-STARRS 1	LIX	3.2 km	MPC · JPL
501495	2014 DO_{8}	—	October 12, 2013	Mount Lemmon	Mount Lemmon Survey	·	2.8 km	MPC · JPL
501496	2014 DF_{9}	—	January 28, 2014	Kitt Peak	Spacewatch	·	2.9 km	MPC · JPL
501497	2014 DW_{23}	—	December 17, 2007	Catalina	CSS	·	2.7 km	MPC · JPL
501498	2014 DP_{28}	—	January 7, 2014	Mount Lemmon	Mount Lemmon Survey	·	3.0 km	MPC · JPL
501499	2014 DB_{29}	—	March 21, 2009	Kitt Peak	Spacewatch	HYG	2.3 km	MPC · JPL
501500	2014 DZ_{30}	—	March 17, 2004	Kitt Peak	Spacewatch	·	1.5 km	MPC · JPL

== 501501–501600 ==
back to top

Designation			Discovery			Properties		Ref
Permanent	Provisional	Named after	Date	Site	Discoverer(s)	Category	Diam.	Ref
501501	2014 DG_{35}	—	January 18, 2008	Mount Lemmon	Mount Lemmon Survey	EUP	3.9 km	MPC · JPL
501502	2014 DE_{36}	—	December 17, 2007	Kitt Peak	Spacewatch	THM	1.9 km	MPC · JPL
501503	2014 DS_{39}	—	October 9, 2007	Catalina	CSS	·	2.6 km	MPC · JPL
501504	2014 DA_{40}	—	October 20, 2012	Haleakala	Pan-STARRS 1	·	2.5 km	MPC · JPL
501505	2014 DP_{49}	—	February 26, 2014	Haleakala	Pan-STARRS 1	·	2.7 km	MPC · JPL
501506	2014 DV_{68}	—	August 27, 2011	Haleakala	Pan-STARRS 1	·	2.6 km	MPC · JPL
501507	2014 DC_{74}	—	February 26, 2014	Haleakala	Pan-STARRS 1	·	2.1 km	MPC · JPL
501508	2014 DU_{109}	—	July 28, 2011	Haleakala	Pan-STARRS 1	·	2.3 km	MPC · JPL
501509	2014 DZ_{109}	—	February 2, 2008	Mount Lemmon	Mount Lemmon Survey	·	2.5 km	MPC · JPL
501510	2014 DH_{115}	—	September 22, 2006	Anderson Mesa	LONEOS	·	3.6 km	MPC · JPL
501511	2014 DC_{116}	—	September 4, 2011	Haleakala	Pan-STARRS 1	·	2.9 km	MPC · JPL
501512	2014 DE_{116}	—	September 26, 2011	Mount Lemmon	Mount Lemmon Survey	·	2.9 km	MPC · JPL
501513	2014 DQ_{119}	—	March 4, 2005	Kitt Peak	Spacewatch	·	1.9 km	MPC · JPL
501514	2014 DT_{121}	—	August 28, 2011	Haleakala	Pan-STARRS 1	·	3.0 km	MPC · JPL
501515	2014 DB_{127}	—	August 23, 2011	Haleakala	Pan-STARRS 1	·	2.7 km	MPC · JPL
501516	2014 DG_{127}	—	February 19, 2009	Kitt Peak	Spacewatch	·	1.6 km	MPC · JPL
501517	2014 DQ_{127}	—	August 30, 2002	Kitt Peak	Spacewatch	·	1.7 km	MPC · JPL
501518	2014 DB_{128}	—	August 23, 2011	Haleakala	Pan-STARRS 1	·	1.7 km	MPC · JPL
501519	2014 DR_{134}	—	February 28, 2014	Haleakala	Pan-STARRS 1	VER	2.8 km	MPC · JPL
501520	2014 EE_{19}	—	April 13, 2004	Kitt Peak	Spacewatch	·	1.4 km	MPC · JPL
501521	2014 EW_{27}	—	February 9, 2014	Kitt Peak	Spacewatch	·	2.7 km	MPC · JPL
501522	2014 EG_{29}	—	December 16, 2007	Kitt Peak	Spacewatch	·	2.2 km	MPC · JPL
501523	2014 EX_{29}	—	September 26, 2011	Haleakala	Pan-STARRS 1	EOS	2.0 km	MPC · JPL
501524	2014 EA_{31}	—	December 9, 2012	Haleakala	Pan-STARRS 1	·	2.3 km	MPC · JPL
501525	2014 EF_{50}	—	September 4, 2011	Haleakala	Pan-STARRS 1	·	3.9 km	MPC · JPL
501526	2014 EF_{51}	—	February 20, 2014	Haleakala	Pan-STARRS 1	·	3.8 km	MPC · JPL
501527	2014 FR_{3}	—	January 22, 2002	Kitt Peak	Spacewatch	·	2.6 km	MPC · JPL
501528	2014 FV_{5}	—	July 28, 2011	Haleakala	Pan-STARRS 1	·	2.1 km	MPC · JPL
501529	2014 FA_{8}	—	January 18, 2008	Mount Lemmon	Mount Lemmon Survey	·	2.9 km	MPC · JPL
501530	2014 FH_{8}	—	March 24, 2003	Kitt Peak	Spacewatch	TIR	2.4 km	MPC · JPL
501531	2014 FP_{19}	—	October 6, 2012	Haleakala	Pan-STARRS 1	LUT	4.2 km	MPC · JPL
501532	2014 FR_{21}	—	April 26, 2009	Mount Lemmon	Mount Lemmon Survey	·	2.3 km	MPC · JPL
501533	2014 FV_{39}	—	March 24, 2003	Kitt Peak	Spacewatch	·	2.3 km	MPC · JPL
501534	2014 FQ_{55}	—	March 11, 2008	XuYi	PMO NEO Survey Program	(69559)	3.9 km	MPC · JPL
501535	2014 HY_{35}	—	September 24, 2011	Haleakala	Pan-STARRS 1	·	2.9 km	MPC · JPL
501536	2014 HQ_{122}	—	February 13, 2008	Mount Lemmon	Mount Lemmon Survey	·	2.3 km	MPC · JPL
501537	2014 HH_{161}	—	November 5, 2011	Haleakala	Pan-STARRS 1	EOS	2.2 km	MPC · JPL
501538	2014 HM_{168}	—	April 4, 2014	Haleakala	Pan-STARRS 1	·	3.4 km	MPC · JPL
501539	2014 JZ_{2}	—	October 25, 2011	Haleakala	Pan-STARRS 1	·	2.8 km	MPC · JPL
501540	2014 JF_{25}	—	April 7, 2014	Mount Lemmon	Mount Lemmon Survey	H	730 m	MPC · JPL
501541	2014 JJ_{40}	—	March 1, 2009	Kitt Peak	Spacewatch	AGN	980 m	MPC · JPL
501542	2014 JE_{56}	—	April 10, 2014	Haleakala	Pan-STARRS 1	H	520 m	MPC · JPL
501543	2014 JG_{56}	—	January 30, 2011	Mount Lemmon	Mount Lemmon Survey	H	490 m	MPC · JPL
501544	2014 JH_{56}	—	September 15, 2012	Kitt Peak	Spacewatch	H	480 m	MPC · JPL
501545	2014 JC_{66}	—	February 28, 2014	Haleakala	Pan-STARRS 1	EOS	2.1 km	MPC · JPL
501546	2014 JJ_{80}	—	May 7, 2014	Haleakala	Pan-STARRS 1	other TNO	271 km	MPC · JPL
501547	2014 KN_{21}	—	March 17, 2004	Kitt Peak	Spacewatch	H	350 m	MPC · JPL
501548	2014 KX_{81}	—	January 20, 2009	Mount Lemmon	Mount Lemmon Survey	·	1.3 km	MPC · JPL
501549	2014 KC_{85}	—	October 17, 2012	Haleakala	Pan-STARRS 1	H	530 m	MPC · JPL
501550	2014 KJ_{85}	—	April 22, 2014	Mount Lemmon	Mount Lemmon Survey	H	520 m	MPC · JPL
501551	2014 KS_{86}	—	March 5, 2006	Kitt Peak	Spacewatch	H	410 m	MPC · JPL
501552	2014 LQ_{9}	—	June 3, 2014	Haleakala	Pan-STARRS 1	H	470 m	MPC · JPL
501553	2014 LB_{16}	—	December 1, 2005	Kitt Peak	L. H. Wasserman, R. L. Millis	·	650 m	MPC · JPL
501554	2014 LN_{24}	—	June 6, 2014	Haleakala	Pan-STARRS 1	H	440 m	MPC · JPL
501555	2014 LX_{25}	—	June 9, 2014	Mount Lemmon	Mount Lemmon Survey	H	460 m	MPC · JPL
501556	2014 LF_{26}	—	September 21, 2004	Socorro	LINEAR	H	480 m	MPC · JPL
501557	2014 LX_{26}	—	January 30, 2011	Catalina	CSS	H	550 m	MPC · JPL
501558	2014 LD_{27}	—	February 28, 2011	La Sagra	OAM	H	410 m	MPC · JPL
501559	2014 MO_{18}	—	April 25, 2011	Mount Lemmon	Mount Lemmon Survey	H	610 m	MPC · JPL
501560	2014 MD_{37}	—	January 16, 2009	Kitt Peak	Spacewatch	·	740 m	MPC · JPL
501561	2014 MG_{37}	—	June 26, 2014	Haleakala	Pan-STARRS 1	·	660 m	MPC · JPL
501562	2014 MA_{55}	—	February 6, 2008	Catalina	CSS	H	450 m	MPC · JPL
501563	2014 NA_{19}	—	July 2, 2014	Mount Lemmon	Mount Lemmon Survey	H	480 m	MPC · JPL
501564	2014 NT_{28}	—	May 7, 2014	Haleakala	Pan-STARRS 1	·	580 m	MPC · JPL
501565	2014 NQ_{59}	—	May 25, 2011	Catalina	CSS	H	560 m	MPC · JPL
501566	2014 NV_{62}	—	June 20, 2014	Haleakala	Pan-STARRS 1	H	510 m	MPC · JPL
501567	2014 NF_{63}	—	March 30, 2011	Mount Lemmon	Mount Lemmon Survey	AMO	210 m	MPC · JPL
501568	2014 OC	—	May 9, 2014	Haleakala	Pan-STARRS 1	H	630 m	MPC · JPL
501569	2014 OE_{5}	—	January 16, 2013	Haleakala	Pan-STARRS 1	·	870 m	MPC · JPL
501570	2014 OQ_{43}	—	September 22, 2003	Palomar	NEAT	·	2.0 km	MPC · JPL
501571	2014 OQ_{97}	—	January 18, 2013	Haleakala	Pan-STARRS 1	H	650 m	MPC · JPL
501572	2014 OP_{127}	—	July 25, 2014	Haleakala	Pan-STARRS 1	V	530 m	MPC · JPL
501573	2014 OV_{143}	—	February 27, 2006	Kitt Peak	Spacewatch	NYS	890 m	MPC · JPL
501574	2014 OO_{195}	—	October 25, 2011	Haleakala	Pan-STARRS 1	·	660 m	MPC · JPL
501575	2014 OB_{232}	—	August 31, 2011	Haleakala	Pan-STARRS 1	·	550 m	MPC · JPL
501576	2014 OA_{296}	—	March 25, 2010	Kitt Peak	Spacewatch	·	590 m	MPC · JPL
501577	2014 OG_{296}	—	May 19, 2010	Mount Lemmon	Mount Lemmon Survey	·	770 m	MPC · JPL
501578	2014 OX_{296}	—	December 25, 2011	Mount Lemmon	Mount Lemmon Survey	·	610 m	MPC · JPL
501579	2014 OE_{366}	—	December 23, 2012	Haleakala	Pan-STARRS 1	H	430 m	MPC · JPL
501580	2014 OZ_{390}	—	July 29, 2014	Haleakala	Pan-STARRS 1	H	380 m	MPC · JPL
501581	2014 OB_{394}	—	July 26, 2014	Haleakala	Pan-STARRS 1	other TNO	204 km	MPC · JPL
501582	2014 PN_{21}	—	June 5, 2014	Haleakala	Pan-STARRS 1	·	470 m	MPC · JPL
501583	2014 QS_{2}	—	June 22, 2014	Mount Lemmon	Mount Lemmon Survey	H	470 m	MPC · JPL
501584	2014 QZ_{21}	—	August 18, 2014	Haleakala	Pan-STARRS 1	·	700 m	MPC · JPL
501585	2014 QA_{43}	—	May 10, 2014	Haleakala	Pan-STARRS 1	T_{j} (2.41) · unusual	30 km	MPC · JPL
501586	2014 QG_{119}	—	September 4, 2011	Haleakala	Pan-STARRS 1	·	630 m	MPC · JPL
501587	2014 QE_{124}	—	May 3, 2003	Kitt Peak	Spacewatch	·	690 m	MPC · JPL
501588	2014 QX_{136}	—	August 20, 2014	Haleakala	Pan-STARRS 1	·	1.4 km	MPC · JPL
501589	2014 QY_{140}	—	September 23, 2011	Haleakala	Pan-STARRS 1	·	580 m	MPC · JPL
501590	2014 QN_{141}	—	January 19, 2012	Haleakala	Pan-STARRS 1	HNS	980 m	MPC · JPL
501591	2014 QF_{166}	—	February 10, 2010	Kitt Peak	Spacewatch	H	510 m	MPC · JPL
501592	2014 QK_{166}	—	June 30, 2014	Haleakala	Pan-STARRS 1	PHO	860 m	MPC · JPL
501593	2014 QY_{198}	—	December 4, 2007	Catalina	CSS	·	1.4 km	MPC · JPL
501594	2014 QA_{224}	—	August 3, 2014	Haleakala	Pan-STARRS 1	·	580 m	MPC · JPL
501595	2014 QO_{226}	—	September 22, 2008	Kitt Peak	Spacewatch	critical	570 m	MPC · JPL
501596	2014 QX_{237}	—	January 16, 2009	Mount Lemmon	Mount Lemmon Survey	·	420 m	MPC · JPL
501597	2014 QH_{240}	—	October 25, 2011	Haleakala	Pan-STARRS 1	·	470 m	MPC · JPL
501598	2014 QD_{241}	—	October 24, 2011	Mount Lemmon	Mount Lemmon Survey	·	490 m	MPC · JPL
501599	2014 QA_{300}	—	February 25, 2006	Kitt Peak	Spacewatch	·	880 m	MPC · JPL
501600	2014 QT_{300}	—	February 9, 2013	Haleakala	Pan-STARRS 1	·	600 m	MPC · JPL

== 501601–501700 ==
back to top

Designation			Discovery			Properties		Ref
Permanent	Provisional	Named after	Date	Site	Discoverer(s)	Category	Diam.	Ref
501601	2014 QV_{306}	—	October 18, 2011	Kitt Peak	Spacewatch	·	570 m	MPC · JPL
501602	2014 QS_{322}	—	October 30, 2007	Catalina	CSS	MAS	670 m	MPC · JPL
501603	2014 QT_{328}	—	October 25, 2011	Haleakala	Pan-STARRS 1	·	660 m	MPC · JPL
501604	2014 QQ_{336}	—	December 16, 2004	Kitt Peak	Spacewatch	·	680 m	MPC · JPL
501605	2014 QU_{357}	—	March 11, 2005	Kitt Peak	Spacewatch	·	1.3 km	MPC · JPL
501606	2014 QC_{369}	—	September 27, 2011	Mount Lemmon	Mount Lemmon Survey	·	540 m	MPC · JPL
501607	2014 QL_{382}	—	May 5, 2010	Mount Lemmon	Mount Lemmon Survey	·	600 m	MPC · JPL
501608	2014 QU_{390}	—	January 14, 2013	Catalina	CSS	H	490 m	MPC · JPL
501609	2014 QU_{403}	—	October 25, 2011	Haleakala	Pan-STARRS 1	·	670 m	MPC · JPL
501610	2014 QG_{417}	—	April 10, 2013	Mount Lemmon	Mount Lemmon Survey	·	1.4 km	MPC · JPL
501611	2014 QW_{438}	—	February 7, 2008	Kitt Peak	Spacewatch	·	1.2 km	MPC · JPL
501612	2014 RE	—	December 20, 2004	Anderson Mesa	LONEOS	·	750 m	MPC · JPL
501613	2014 RV_{30}	—	September 15, 2014	Catalina	CSS	H	510 m	MPC · JPL
501614	2014 RP_{41}	—	July 18, 2007	Mount Lemmon	Mount Lemmon Survey	·	740 m	MPC · JPL
501615	2014 SQ_{36}	—	January 22, 2006	Mount Lemmon	Mount Lemmon Survey	·	480 m	MPC · JPL
501616	2014 SN_{48}	—	October 13, 2007	Mount Lemmon	Mount Lemmon Survey	·	870 m	MPC · JPL
501617	2014 SL_{58}	—	August 23, 2014	Haleakala	Pan-STARRS 1	·	520 m	MPC · JPL
501618	2014 SL_{93}	—	July 27, 2014	Haleakala	Pan-STARRS 1	·	570 m	MPC · JPL
501619	2014 SQ_{96}	—	October 26, 2005	Kitt Peak	Spacewatch	·	670 m	MPC · JPL
501620	2014 SF_{143}	—	December 18, 2009	Mount Lemmon	Mount Lemmon Survey	H	600 m	MPC · JPL
501621	2014 SG_{144}	—	March 10, 2007	Mount Lemmon	Mount Lemmon Survey	·	570 m	MPC · JPL
501622	2014 SU_{147}	—	September 5, 2007	Catalina	CSS	·	690 m	MPC · JPL
501623	2014 SD_{156}	—	September 14, 2007	Mount Lemmon	Mount Lemmon Survey	·	770 m	MPC · JPL
501624	2014 SG_{157}	—	October 7, 2004	Kitt Peak	Spacewatch	·	480 m	MPC · JPL
501625	2014 SZ_{164}	—	October 26, 2011	Haleakala	Pan-STARRS 1	·	640 m	MPC · JPL
501626	2014 SZ_{171}	—	April 8, 2013	Mount Lemmon	Mount Lemmon Survey	·	570 m	MPC · JPL
501627	2014 SD_{206}	—	October 24, 2011	Kitt Peak	Spacewatch	·	660 m	MPC · JPL
501628	2014 SU_{206}	—	September 12, 2007	Mount Lemmon	Mount Lemmon Survey	·	560 m	MPC · JPL
501629	2014 SA_{208}	—	April 8, 2008	Kitt Peak	Spacewatch	·	1.1 km	MPC · JPL
501630	2014 SD_{208}	—	August 10, 2007	Kitt Peak	Spacewatch	·	630 m	MPC · JPL
501631	2014 SS_{208}	—	December 20, 2004	Mount Lemmon	Mount Lemmon Survey	·	910 m	MPC · JPL
501632	2014 SZ_{208}	—	January 18, 2012	Mount Lemmon	Mount Lemmon Survey	·	690 m	MPC · JPL
501633	2014 SZ_{209}	—	July 12, 2013	Haleakala	Pan-STARRS 1	·	1.9 km	MPC · JPL
501634	2014 SH_{213}	—	June 22, 2010	WISE	WISE	·	2.0 km	MPC · JPL
501635	2014 SC_{214}	—	December 13, 2010	Mount Lemmon	Mount Lemmon Survey	·	1.7 km	MPC · JPL
501636	2014 SM_{214}	—	September 4, 2014	Haleakala	Pan-STARRS 1	·	640 m	MPC · JPL
501637	2014 SZ_{215}	—	April 19, 2012	Kitt Peak	Spacewatch	·	1.2 km	MPC · JPL
501638	2014 SD_{216}	—	October 7, 2004	Socorro	LINEAR	·	720 m	MPC · JPL
501639	2014 SE_{216}	—	February 2, 2005	Kitt Peak	Spacewatch	V	730 m	MPC · JPL
501640	2014 SK_{216}	—	December 20, 1995	Kitt Peak	Spacewatch	·	860 m	MPC · JPL
501641	2014 SR_{216}	—	April 27, 2012	Haleakala	Pan-STARRS 1	·	2.2 km	MPC · JPL
501642	2014 SD_{217}	—	September 12, 2007	Catalina	CSS	·	800 m	MPC · JPL
501643	2014 SZ_{217}	—	September 28, 1994	Kitt Peak	Spacewatch	·	690 m	MPC · JPL
501644	2014 SB_{219}	—	November 26, 2003	Kitt Peak	Spacewatch	V	570 m	MPC · JPL
501645	2014 SJ_{221}	—	January 16, 2009	Kitt Peak	Spacewatch	·	720 m	MPC · JPL
501646	2014 SC_{223}	—	October 17, 1998	Kitt Peak	Spacewatch	·	580 m	MPC · JPL
501647	2014 SD_{224}	—	September 22, 2014	Haleakala	Pan-STARRS 1	ATE	120 m	MPC · JPL
501648	2014 SB_{227}	—	March 19, 2013	Haleakala	Pan-STARRS 1	NYS	1.2 km	MPC · JPL
501649	2014 SS_{233}	—	March 16, 2009	Kitt Peak	Spacewatch	·	870 m	MPC · JPL
501650	2014 SA_{271}	—	March 13, 2010	Mount Lemmon	Mount Lemmon Survey	·	520 m	MPC · JPL
501651	2014 SZ_{281}	—	October 9, 2007	Kitt Peak	Spacewatch	·	990 m	MPC · JPL
501652	2014 SA_{293}	—	February 2, 2006	Catalina	CSS	·	1.3 km	MPC · JPL
501653	2014 SO_{297}	—	August 27, 2014	Haleakala	Pan-STARRS 1	·	540 m	MPC · JPL
501654	2014 SD_{299}	—	October 8, 2004	Kitt Peak	Spacewatch	·	870 m	MPC · JPL
501655	2014 SS_{300}	—	February 3, 2008	Mount Lemmon	Mount Lemmon Survey	V	550 m	MPC · JPL
501656	2014 SG_{305}	—	August 28, 2014	Haleakala	Pan-STARRS 1	·	570 m	MPC · JPL
501657	2014 SU_{319}	—	September 19, 2001	Socorro	LINEAR	·	480 m	MPC · JPL
501658	2014 SA_{333}	—	November 3, 2007	Kitt Peak	Spacewatch	·	760 m	MPC · JPL
501659	2014 SC_{335}	—	October 15, 2007	Mount Lemmon	Mount Lemmon Survey	·	1.2 km	MPC · JPL
501660	2014 SJ_{336}	—	May 11, 2007	Mount Lemmon	Mount Lemmon Survey	·	520 m	MPC · JPL
501661	2014 ST_{336}	—	September 21, 2003	Kitt Peak	Spacewatch	·	790 m	MPC · JPL
501662	2014 SZ_{337}	—	September 2, 2014	Haleakala	Pan-STARRS 1	·	830 m	MPC · JPL
501663	2014 SF_{338}	—	September 2, 2014	Haleakala	Pan-STARRS 1	·	660 m	MPC · JPL
501664	2014 SK_{339}	—	September 2, 2014	Haleakala	Pan-STARRS 1	·	660 m	MPC · JPL
501665	2014 SD_{343}	—	September 24, 2011	Mount Lemmon	Mount Lemmon Survey	·	670 m	MPC · JPL
501666	2014 SJ_{348}	—	January 20, 2012	Mount Lemmon	Mount Lemmon Survey	·	520 m	MPC · JPL
501667	2014 TG_{4}	—	October 8, 2004	Kitt Peak	Spacewatch	·	620 m	MPC · JPL
501668	2014 TB_{6}	—	October 10, 2004	Kitt Peak	Spacewatch	·	760 m	MPC · JPL
501669	2014 TB_{14}	—	November 2, 2007	Kitt Peak	Spacewatch	·	1.0 km	MPC · JPL
501670	2014 TE_{16}	—	November 27, 2011	Mount Lemmon	Mount Lemmon Survey	·	550 m	MPC · JPL
501671	2014 TT_{19}	—	January 21, 2012	Kitt Peak	Spacewatch	·	1.0 km	MPC · JPL
501672	2014 TT_{22}	—	September 30, 2003	Kitt Peak	Spacewatch	V	660 m	MPC · JPL
501673	2014 TD_{28}	—	December 6, 2011	Haleakala	Pan-STARRS 1	·	740 m	MPC · JPL
501674	2014 TU_{28}	—	December 31, 2008	Kitt Peak	Spacewatch	·	620 m	MPC · JPL
501675	2014 TS_{29}	—	November 18, 2003	Kitt Peak	Spacewatch	MAS	780 m	MPC · JPL
501676	2014 TA_{35}	—	September 20, 2014	Catalina	CSS	H	450 m	MPC · JPL
501677	2014 TG_{42}	—	October 9, 2004	Kitt Peak	Spacewatch	·	590 m	MPC · JPL
501678	2014 TB_{45}	—	October 13, 2004	Kitt Peak	Spacewatch	·	450 m	MPC · JPL
501679	2014 TX_{45}	—	August 31, 2014	Haleakala	Pan-STARRS 1	·	900 m	MPC · JPL
501680	2014 TE_{47}	—	October 30, 2007	Kitt Peak	Spacewatch	·	850 m	MPC · JPL
501681	2014 TF_{48}	—	September 10, 2007	Mount Lemmon	Mount Lemmon Survey	·	470 m	MPC · JPL
501682	2014 TG_{48}	—	January 21, 2012	Haleakala	Pan-STARRS 1	V	580 m	MPC · JPL
501683	2014 TY_{53}	—	October 14, 2014	Kitt Peak	Spacewatch	V	560 m	MPC · JPL
501684	2014 TO_{54}	—	September 20, 2014	Haleakala	Pan-STARRS 1	·	690 m	MPC · JPL
501685	2014 TV_{54}	—	October 15, 2007	Mount Lemmon	Mount Lemmon Survey	·	670 m	MPC · JPL
501686	2014 TQ_{58}	—	October 13, 2014	Kitt Peak	Spacewatch	·	1.8 km	MPC · JPL
501687	2014 TM_{60}	—	September 19, 2007	Kitt Peak	Spacewatch	·	470 m	MPC · JPL
501688	2014 TB_{65}	—	September 26, 1998	Socorro	LINEAR	·	790 m	MPC · JPL
501689	2014 TL_{69}	—	January 23, 2006	Kitt Peak	Spacewatch	·	710 m	MPC · JPL
501690	2014 TD_{74}	—	February 2, 2005	Kitt Peak	Spacewatch	·	690 m	MPC · JPL
501691	2014 TJ_{74}	—	April 5, 2010	Kitt Peak	Spacewatch	·	730 m	MPC · JPL
501692	2014 UW	—	January 2, 2001	Socorro	LINEAR	·	840 m	MPC · JPL
501693	2014 UW_{1}	—	November 2, 2007	Mount Lemmon	Mount Lemmon Survey	·	640 m	MPC · JPL
501694	2014 UB_{4}	—	September 9, 2004	Kitt Peak	Spacewatch	·	660 m	MPC · JPL
501695	2014 UC_{4}	—	February 28, 2009	Kitt Peak	Spacewatch	·	1.5 km	MPC · JPL
501696	2014 UA_{5}	—	October 8, 2007	Mount Lemmon	Mount Lemmon Survey	·	600 m	MPC · JPL
501697	2014 UQ_{6}	—	December 30, 2011	Kitt Peak	Spacewatch	·	580 m	MPC · JPL
501698	2014 UE_{7}	—	December 20, 2004	Mount Lemmon	Mount Lemmon Survey	·	620 m	MPC · JPL
501699	2014 UN_{9}	—	January 12, 2010	WISE	WISE	·	2.3 km	MPC · JPL
501700	2014 UL_{10}	—	January 2, 2012	Kitt Peak	Spacewatch	·	560 m	MPC · JPL

== 501701–501800 ==
back to top

Designation			Discovery			Properties		Ref
Permanent	Provisional	Named after	Date	Site	Discoverer(s)	Category	Diam.	Ref
501701	2014 UC_{11}	—	January 27, 2012	Mount Lemmon	Mount Lemmon Survey	V	430 m	MPC · JPL
501702	2014 UD_{12}	—	September 25, 2014	Mount Lemmon	Mount Lemmon Survey	·	680 m	MPC · JPL
501703	2014 UA_{13}	—	October 5, 2007	Kitt Peak	Spacewatch	·	740 m	MPC · JPL
501704	2014 UK_{13}	—	October 19, 2007	Kitt Peak	Spacewatch	V	510 m	MPC · JPL
501705	2014 UG_{18}	—	October 31, 2010	Mount Lemmon	Mount Lemmon Survey	·	960 m	MPC · JPL
501706	2014 UV_{21}	—	June 18, 2013	Haleakala	Pan-STARRS 1	·	960 m	MPC · JPL
501707	2014 UL_{22}	—	April 25, 2003	Kitt Peak	Spacewatch	·	2.2 km	MPC · JPL
501708	2014 UW_{22}	—	October 24, 2007	Mount Lemmon	Mount Lemmon Survey	·	730 m	MPC · JPL
501709	2014 UF_{23}	—	March 10, 2008	Kitt Peak	Spacewatch	·	1.4 km	MPC · JPL
501710	2014 UY_{23}	—	August 31, 2014	Haleakala	Pan-STARRS 1	·	560 m	MPC · JPL
501711	2014 UB_{25}	—	December 29, 2011	Mount Lemmon	Mount Lemmon Survey	·	670 m	MPC · JPL
501712	2014 UP_{27}	—	February 9, 2005	Kitt Peak	Spacewatch	·	800 m	MPC · JPL
501713	2014 UH_{28}	—	October 16, 2007	Mount Lemmon	Mount Lemmon Survey	PHO	750 m	MPC · JPL
501714	2014 UT_{37}	—	April 1, 2005	Kitt Peak	Spacewatch	NYS	1.2 km	MPC · JPL
501715	2014 UG_{39}	—	September 2, 2014	Haleakala	Pan-STARRS 1	·	540 m	MPC · JPL
501716	2014 UN_{40}	—	November 10, 2004	Kitt Peak	Spacewatch	·	930 m	MPC · JPL
501717	2014 US_{41}	—	October 30, 1999	Kitt Peak	Spacewatch	·	1.2 km	MPC · JPL
501718	2014 UL_{42}	—	October 2, 1997	Caussols	ODAS	·	510 m	MPC · JPL
501719	2014 UX_{42}	—	October 17, 2003	Kitt Peak	Spacewatch	·	1.2 km	MPC · JPL
501720	2014 UT_{43}	—	July 27, 2014	Haleakala	Pan-STARRS 1	BRA	1.6 km	MPC · JPL
501721	2014 UC_{48}	—	January 18, 2012	Mount Lemmon	Mount Lemmon Survey	·	820 m	MPC · JPL
501722	2014 UW_{48}	—	November 1, 2011	Kitt Peak	Spacewatch	·	740 m	MPC · JPL
501723	2014 UJ_{50}	—	November 7, 2007	Kitt Peak	Spacewatch	V	550 m	MPC · JPL
501724	2014 UG_{51}	—	September 18, 2001	Anderson Mesa	LONEOS	·	520 m	MPC · JPL
501725	2014 UC_{54}	—	October 20, 2006	Mount Lemmon	Mount Lemmon Survey	·	1.7 km	MPC · JPL
501726	2014 UH_{54}	—	October 12, 2007	Kitt Peak	Spacewatch	·	520 m	MPC · JPL
501727	2014 UF_{55}	—	February 1, 2005	Kitt Peak	Spacewatch	·	670 m	MPC · JPL
501728	2014 UB_{68}	—	March 6, 1999	Kitt Peak	Spacewatch	·	610 m	MPC · JPL
501729	2014 UD_{78}	—	September 18, 2007	Mount Lemmon	Mount Lemmon Survey	·	1.0 km	MPC · JPL
501730	2014 UG_{82}	—	November 13, 2007	Mount Lemmon	Mount Lemmon Survey	·	1.2 km	MPC · JPL
501731	2014 UG_{84}	—	October 3, 2014	Mount Lemmon	Mount Lemmon Survey	·	570 m	MPC · JPL
501732	2014 UZ_{84}	—	January 19, 2012	Haleakala	Pan-STARRS 1	·	1.3 km	MPC · JPL
501733	2014 UC_{87}	—	October 23, 2006	Kitt Peak	Spacewatch	BRG	1.8 km	MPC · JPL
501734	2014 UO_{90}	—	November 26, 2003	Kitt Peak	Spacewatch	V	660 m	MPC · JPL
501735	2014 UX_{91}	—	April 26, 2006	Kitt Peak	Spacewatch	·	830 m	MPC · JPL
501736	2014 UU_{93}	—	October 15, 2007	Mount Lemmon	Mount Lemmon Survey	·	610 m	MPC · JPL
501737	2014 UN_{95}	—	September 19, 2003	Anderson Mesa	LONEOS	·	1.1 km	MPC · JPL
501738	2014 UF_{96}	—	April 19, 2007	Mount Lemmon	Mount Lemmon Survey	·	720 m	MPC · JPL
501739	2014 UM_{96}	—	November 30, 2011	Kitt Peak	Spacewatch	·	600 m	MPC · JPL
501740	2014 UV_{98}	—	October 15, 2014	Kitt Peak	Spacewatch	·	1.8 km	MPC · JPL
501741	2014 UF_{106}	—	October 16, 2014	Kitt Peak	Spacewatch	·	810 m	MPC · JPL
501742	2014 UN_{112}	—	December 21, 2008	Mount Lemmon	Mount Lemmon Survey	·	630 m	MPC · JPL
501743	2014 UM_{116}	—	July 6, 1997	Kitt Peak	Spacewatch	·	600 m	MPC · JPL
501744	2014 UZ_{118}	—	November 19, 2003	Kitt Peak	Spacewatch	·	1.0 km	MPC · JPL
501745	2014 UB_{124}	—	January 17, 2009	Mount Lemmon	Mount Lemmon Survey	·	760 m	MPC · JPL
501746	2014 UL_{129}	—	October 31, 2007	Mount Lemmon	Mount Lemmon Survey	·	930 m	MPC · JPL
501747	2014 UM_{134}	—	October 14, 2007	Mount Lemmon	Mount Lemmon Survey	NYS	630 m	MPC · JPL
501748	2014 UT_{134}	—	April 15, 2007	Kitt Peak	Spacewatch	·	1.0 km	MPC · JPL
501749	2014 UD_{135}	—	September 10, 2004	Socorro	LINEAR	·	610 m	MPC · JPL
501750	2014 UU_{135}	—	January 31, 2012	Catalina	CSS	·	990 m	MPC · JPL
501751	2014 UJ_{136}	—	September 24, 2014	Mount Lemmon	Mount Lemmon Survey	·	810 m	MPC · JPL
501752	2014 UT_{138}	—	December 19, 2003	Kitt Peak	Spacewatch	·	1.1 km	MPC · JPL
501753	2014 UJ_{140}	—	December 3, 2000	Kitt Peak	Spacewatch	V	600 m	MPC · JPL
501754	2014 UE_{148}	—	September 26, 2006	Kitt Peak	Spacewatch	·	1.2 km	MPC · JPL
501755	2014 UB_{154}	—	August 30, 2014	Haleakala	Pan-STARRS 1	·	660 m	MPC · JPL
501756	2014 UU_{154}	—	May 7, 2010	Mount Lemmon	Mount Lemmon Survey	·	610 m	MPC · JPL
501757	2014 UB_{157}	—	August 21, 2001	Kitt Peak	Spacewatch	·	690 m	MPC · JPL
501758	2014 UL_{159}	—	November 30, 2000	Kitt Peak	Spacewatch	·	970 m	MPC · JPL
501759	2014 UW_{161}	—	December 22, 2003	Kitt Peak	Spacewatch	·	1.2 km	MPC · JPL
501760	2014 UE_{171}	—	April 2, 2006	Kitt Peak	Spacewatch	·	780 m	MPC · JPL
501761	2014 UN_{171}	—	April 13, 2013	Haleakala	Pan-STARRS 1	·	640 m	MPC · JPL
501762	2014 UC_{172}	—	August 10, 2007	Kitt Peak	Spacewatch	·	590 m	MPC · JPL
501763	2014 UP_{172}	—	September 13, 2004	Kitt Peak	Spacewatch	·	610 m	MPC · JPL
501764	2014 UX_{173}	—	August 31, 2014	Haleakala	Pan-STARRS 1	·	1.1 km	MPC · JPL
501765	2014 UY_{179}	—	May 8, 2010	Mount Lemmon	Mount Lemmon Survey	·	640 m	MPC · JPL
501766	2014 UT_{181}	—	April 7, 2013	Mount Lemmon	Mount Lemmon Survey	·	790 m	MPC · JPL
501767	2014 UA_{184}	—	May 9, 2010	Mount Lemmon	Mount Lemmon Survey	·	530 m	MPC · JPL
501768	2014 UQ_{190}	—	December 27, 2011	Mount Lemmon	Mount Lemmon Survey	·	460 m	MPC · JPL
501769	2014 UP_{200}	—	October 31, 2007	Kitt Peak	Spacewatch	·	640 m	MPC · JPL
501770	2014 UO_{201}	—	September 11, 2001	Anderson Mesa	LONEOS	·	730 m	MPC · JPL
501771	2014 UQ_{204}	—	October 11, 2007	Mount Lemmon	Mount Lemmon Survey	·	690 m	MPC · JPL
501772	2014 UT_{206}	—	September 25, 2007	Mount Lemmon	Mount Lemmon Survey	·	710 m	MPC · JPL
501773	2014 UY_{206}	—	January 17, 2009	Kitt Peak	Spacewatch	·	990 m	MPC · JPL
501774	2014 UG_{207}	—	April 6, 2013	Haleakala	Pan-STARRS 1	·	680 m	MPC · JPL
501775	2014 UG_{210}	—	April 10, 2013	Haleakala	Pan-STARRS 1	·	620 m	MPC · JPL
501776	2014 VH_{4}	—	September 17, 2004	Kitt Peak	Spacewatch	·	520 m	MPC · JPL
501777	2014 VF_{5}	—	January 25, 2006	Kitt Peak	Spacewatch	·	730 m	MPC · JPL
501778	2014 VA_{6}	—	January 20, 2009	Catalina	CSS	·	730 m	MPC · JPL
501779	2014 VB_{10}	—	May 27, 2010	WISE	WISE	PHO	2.3 km	MPC · JPL
501780	2014 VY_{10}	—	December 27, 2011	Mount Lemmon	Mount Lemmon Survey	·	770 m	MPC · JPL
501781	2014 VB_{11}	—	September 4, 2003	Kitt Peak	Spacewatch	·	760 m	MPC · JPL
501782	2014 VV_{14}	—	December 31, 2007	Kitt Peak	Spacewatch	·	900 m	MPC · JPL
501783	2014 VL_{16}	—	October 9, 2007	Mount Lemmon	Mount Lemmon Survey	·	430 m	MPC · JPL
501784	2014 VO_{17}	—	February 27, 2012	Haleakala	Pan-STARRS 1	·	970 m	MPC · JPL
501785	2014 VR_{18}	—	November 29, 2011	Kitt Peak	Spacewatch	·	690 m	MPC · JPL
501786	2014 VQ_{21}	—	October 20, 2007	Mount Lemmon	Mount Lemmon Survey	V	430 m	MPC · JPL
501787	2014 VV_{21}	—	October 23, 2014	Kitt Peak	Spacewatch	·	810 m	MPC · JPL
501788	2014 VK_{22}	—	September 24, 1995	Kitt Peak	Spacewatch	MAS	490 m	MPC · JPL
501789	2014 VZ_{23}	—	September 17, 1995	Kitt Peak	Spacewatch	·	1.1 km	MPC · JPL
501790	2014 VB_{25}	—	October 10, 2004	Kitt Peak	Spacewatch	·	490 m	MPC · JPL
501791	2014 VV_{28}	—	October 12, 1996	Kitt Peak	Spacewatch	·	1.1 km	MPC · JPL
501792	2014 VO_{30}	—	April 14, 2004	Kitt Peak	Spacewatch	·	1.2 km	MPC · JPL
501793	2014 VV_{30}	—	February 14, 2012	Haleakala	Pan-STARRS 1	·	510 m	MPC · JPL
501794	2014 VZ_{30}	—	April 28, 2012	Mount Lemmon	Mount Lemmon Survey	·	1.8 km	MPC · JPL
501795	2014 VG_{31}	—	December 25, 2011	Kitt Peak	Spacewatch	·	480 m	MPC · JPL
501796	2014 VH_{35}	—	November 8, 1991	Kitt Peak	Spacewatch	·	890 m	MPC · JPL
501797	2014 VJ_{36}	—	September 28, 2003	Kitt Peak	Spacewatch	·	1.1 km	MPC · JPL
501798	2014 VN_{36}	—	January 30, 2012	Mount Lemmon	Mount Lemmon Survey	·	620 m	MPC · JPL
501799	2014 WV_{11}	—	October 30, 2007	Kitt Peak	Spacewatch	·	880 m	MPC · JPL
501800	2014 WE_{24}	—	November 5, 2007	Mount Lemmon	Mount Lemmon Survey	·	910 m	MPC · JPL

== 501801–501900 ==
back to top

Designation			Discovery			Properties		Ref
Permanent	Provisional	Named after	Date	Site	Discoverer(s)	Category	Diam.	Ref
501801	2014 WU_{24}	—	November 2, 2007	Kitt Peak	Spacewatch	·	600 m	MPC · JPL
501802	2014 WB_{25}	—	October 8, 2004	Socorro	LINEAR	·	600 m	MPC · JPL
501803	2014 WA_{34}	—	November 9, 2007	Mount Lemmon	Mount Lemmon Survey	NYS	1.1 km	MPC · JPL
501804	2014 WL_{37}	—	December 30, 2008	Mount Lemmon	Mount Lemmon Survey	·	800 m	MPC · JPL
501805	2014 WM_{46}	—	October 11, 2010	Mount Lemmon	Mount Lemmon Survey	·	1.2 km	MPC · JPL
501806	2014 WV_{49}	—	November 7, 2007	Kitt Peak	Spacewatch	·	950 m	MPC · JPL
501807	2014 WV_{50}	—	September 3, 2014	Mount Lemmon	Mount Lemmon Survey	NYS	900 m	MPC · JPL
501808	2014 WS_{51}	—	November 19, 2007	Kitt Peak	Spacewatch	·	640 m	MPC · JPL
501809	2014 WD_{52}	—	October 18, 2003	Kitt Peak	Spacewatch	·	1.3 km	MPC · JPL
501810	2014 WR_{53}	—	April 13, 2013	Haleakala	Pan-STARRS 1	·	660 m	MPC · JPL
501811	2014 WU_{54}	—	January 7, 2003	Socorro	LINEAR	·	960 m	MPC · JPL
501812	2014 WC_{56}	—	January 3, 2012	Kitt Peak	Spacewatch	·	680 m	MPC · JPL
501813	2014 WH_{56}	—	December 2, 2010	Kitt Peak	Spacewatch	·	1.3 km	MPC · JPL
501814	2014 WB_{59}	—	September 10, 2004	Kitt Peak	Spacewatch	·	530 m	MPC · JPL
501815	2014 WL_{60}	—	August 31, 2014	Haleakala	Pan-STARRS 1	·	790 m	MPC · JPL
501816	2014 WE_{61}	—	April 30, 2013	Kitt Peak	Spacewatch	·	630 m	MPC · JPL
501817	2014 WV_{61}	—	August 31, 2014	Haleakala	Pan-STARRS 1	·	630 m	MPC · JPL
501818	2014 WE_{66}	—	February 3, 2009	Kitt Peak	Spacewatch	·	590 m	MPC · JPL
501819	2014 WA_{67}	—	November 30, 2011	Kitt Peak	Spacewatch	·	670 m	MPC · JPL
501820	2014 WA_{71}	—	May 2, 2013	Haleakala	Pan-STARRS 1	·	570 m	MPC · JPL
501821	2014 WB_{78}	—	October 30, 2007	Mount Lemmon	Mount Lemmon Survey	·	500 m	MPC · JPL
501822	2014 WF_{78}	—	March 3, 2009	Mount Lemmon	Mount Lemmon Survey	·	510 m	MPC · JPL
501823	2014 WY_{84}	—	September 18, 2003	Kitt Peak	Spacewatch	·	850 m	MPC · JPL
501824	2014 WT_{91}	—	July 14, 2013	Haleakala	Pan-STARRS 1	·	1.6 km	MPC · JPL
501825	2014 WJ_{94}	—	January 17, 2009	Kitt Peak	Spacewatch	·	800 m	MPC · JPL
501826	2014 WX_{101}	—	September 9, 2007	Anderson Mesa	LONEOS	·	620 m	MPC · JPL
501827	2014 WY_{104}	—	September 23, 2011	Mount Lemmon	Mount Lemmon Survey	·	840 m	MPC · JPL
501828	2014 WJ_{106}	—	December 10, 2004	Socorro	LINEAR	·	660 m	MPC · JPL
501829	2014 WV_{107}	—	September 7, 2004	Kitt Peak	Spacewatch	·	550 m	MPC · JPL
501830	2014 WG_{109}	—	November 26, 2003	Kitt Peak	Spacewatch	·	1.2 km	MPC · JPL
501831	2014 WT_{122}	—	January 30, 2009	Mount Lemmon	Mount Lemmon Survey	·	590 m	MPC · JPL
501832	2014 WN_{125}	—	February 27, 2012	Haleakala	Pan-STARRS 1	·	790 m	MPC · JPL
501833	2014 WP_{127}	—	October 20, 2007	Catalina	CSS	·	660 m	MPC · JPL
501834	2014 WQ_{128}	—	January 7, 2005	Campo Imperatore	CINEOS	·	550 m	MPC · JPL
501835	2014 WM_{134}	—	October 18, 2007	Mount Lemmon	Mount Lemmon Survey	·	520 m	MPC · JPL
501836	2014 WJ_{135}	—	January 17, 2007	Kitt Peak	Spacewatch	·	1.7 km	MPC · JPL
501837	2014 WL_{135}	—	May 24, 2006	Mount Lemmon	Mount Lemmon Survey	·	710 m	MPC · JPL
501838	2014 WZ_{135}	—	January 26, 2001	Kitt Peak	Spacewatch	·	760 m	MPC · JPL
501839	2014 WP_{137}	—	March 10, 2005	Mount Lemmon	Mount Lemmon Survey	·	830 m	MPC · JPL
501840	2014 WT_{138}	—	November 17, 2014	Haleakala	Pan-STARRS 1	·	2.9 km	MPC · JPL
501841	2014 WT_{139}	—	December 14, 2003	Kitt Peak	Spacewatch	MAS	790 m	MPC · JPL
501842	2014 WK_{141}	—	February 27, 2012	Haleakala	Pan-STARRS 1	·	1.1 km	MPC · JPL
501843	2014 WF_{145}	—	August 23, 2007	Kitt Peak	Spacewatch	·	500 m	MPC · JPL
501844	2014 WQ_{160}	—	July 1, 2013	Haleakala	Pan-STARRS 1	·	870 m	MPC · JPL
501845	2014 WF_{161}	—	June 19, 2010	Mount Lemmon	Mount Lemmon Survey	·	670 m	MPC · JPL
501846	2014 WH_{165}	—	January 8, 2011	Mount Lemmon	Mount Lemmon Survey	·	1.6 km	MPC · JPL
501847	2014 WB_{184}	—	December 14, 2010	Catalina	CSS	·	1.3 km	MPC · JPL
501848	2014 WR_{187}	—	October 23, 2014	Kitt Peak	Spacewatch	·	790 m	MPC · JPL
501849	2014 WA_{190}	—	March 8, 2005	Kitt Peak	Spacewatch	·	930 m	MPC · JPL
501850	2014 WG_{190}	—	January 5, 2012	Kitt Peak	Spacewatch	·	730 m	MPC · JPL
501851	2014 WJ_{194}	—	July 15, 2013	Haleakala	Pan-STARRS 1	·	1.2 km	MPC · JPL
501852	2014 WL_{212}	—	July 8, 2010	Kitt Peak	Spacewatch	V	630 m	MPC · JPL
501853	2014 WS_{212}	—	October 21, 2007	Mount Lemmon	Mount Lemmon Survey	·	1.0 km	MPC · JPL
501854	2014 WH_{214}	—	June 7, 2013	Haleakala	Pan-STARRS 1	·	1.0 km	MPC · JPL
501855	2014 WA_{223}	—	November 20, 2001	Socorro	LINEAR	·	550 m	MPC · JPL
501856	2014 WY_{223}	—	February 29, 2008	XuYi	PMO NEO Survey Program	·	1.0 km	MPC · JPL
501857	2014 WU_{230}	—	February 22, 2006	Catalina	CSS	·	2.5 km	MPC · JPL
501858	2014 WN_{234}	—	April 28, 2012	Kitt Peak	Spacewatch	·	1.4 km	MPC · JPL
501859	2014 WO_{240}	—	November 2, 2007	Mount Lemmon	Mount Lemmon Survey	·	600 m	MPC · JPL
501860	2014 WB_{260}	—	March 21, 2002	Kitt Peak	Spacewatch	·	690 m	MPC · JPL
501861	2014 WD_{263}	—	January 21, 2012	Kitt Peak	Spacewatch	·	530 m	MPC · JPL
501862	2014 WW_{269}	—	January 19, 2004	Kitt Peak	Spacewatch	·	840 m	MPC · JPL
501863	2014 WV_{272}	—	February 1, 2008	Mount Lemmon	Mount Lemmon Survey	·	740 m	MPC · JPL
501864	2014 WX_{274}	—	March 12, 2008	Mount Lemmon	Mount Lemmon Survey	·	1.1 km	MPC · JPL
501865	2014 WT_{279}	—	November 18, 2003	Kitt Peak	Spacewatch	·	990 m	MPC · JPL
501866	2014 WH_{283}	—	November 16, 1995	Kitt Peak	Spacewatch	·	570 m	MPC · JPL
501867	2014 WX_{285}	—	July 1, 2013	Haleakala	Pan-STARRS 1	·	1.6 km	MPC · JPL
501868	2014 WC_{286}	—	June 18, 2013	Haleakala	Pan-STARRS 1	·	1.4 km	MPC · JPL
501869	2014 WV_{286}	—	September 29, 2010	Mount Lemmon	Mount Lemmon Survey	·	660 m	MPC · JPL
501870	2014 WP_{296}	—	September 4, 2014	Haleakala	Pan-STARRS 1	·	1.1 km	MPC · JPL
501871	2014 WS_{322}	—	May 16, 2013	Haleakala	Pan-STARRS 1	·	1.2 km	MPC · JPL
501872	2014 WM_{339}	—	November 16, 2006	Mount Lemmon	Mount Lemmon Survey	·	1.5 km	MPC · JPL
501873	2014 WA_{349}	—	August 14, 2010	Kitt Peak	Spacewatch	V	550 m	MPC · JPL
501874	2014 WO_{349}	—	September 11, 2007	Catalina	CSS	·	610 m	MPC · JPL
501875	2014 WM_{350}	—	May 14, 2010	Mount Lemmon	Mount Lemmon Survey	·	690 m	MPC · JPL
501876	2014 WO_{355}	—	September 19, 2008	Kitt Peak	Spacewatch	·	2.2 km	MPC · JPL
501877	2014 WH_{357}	—	September 15, 2007	Kitt Peak	Spacewatch	·	630 m	MPC · JPL
501878	2014 WF_{365}	—	November 25, 2014	Haleakala	Pan-STARRS 1	APO +1km	2.2 km	MPC · JPL
501879	2014 WV_{378}	—	September 18, 2003	Kitt Peak	Spacewatch	V	560 m	MPC · JPL
501880	2014 WK_{382}	—	October 18, 2009	Mount Lemmon	Mount Lemmon Survey	·	2.2 km	MPC · JPL
501881	2014 WG_{388}	—	September 9, 2007	Mount Lemmon	Mount Lemmon Survey	·	550 m	MPC · JPL
501882	2014 WL_{397}	—	September 10, 2007	Mount Lemmon	Mount Lemmon Survey	·	580 m	MPC · JPL
501883	2014 WQ_{399}	—	December 6, 2008	Kitt Peak	Spacewatch	·	3.2 km	MPC · JPL
501884	2014 WY_{399}	—	October 24, 2014	Mount Lemmon	Mount Lemmon Survey	·	2.5 km	MPC · JPL
501885	2014 WN_{407}	—	October 16, 2007	Kitt Peak	Spacewatch	·	430 m	MPC · JPL
501886	2014 WG_{408}	—	January 1, 2008	Kitt Peak	Spacewatch	·	820 m	MPC · JPL
501887	2014 WG_{419}	—	January 3, 2012	Mount Lemmon	Mount Lemmon Survey	·	550 m	MPC · JPL
501888	2014 WB_{420}	—	March 11, 2011	Catalina	CSS	·	1.9 km	MPC · JPL
501889	2014 WF_{421}	—	November 26, 2014	Mount Lemmon	Mount Lemmon Survey	EUN	1.1 km	MPC · JPL
501890	2014 WR_{422}	—	March 26, 2010	WISE	WISE	·	3.2 km	MPC · JPL
501891	2014 WX_{425}	—	February 25, 2011	Mount Lemmon	Mount Lemmon Survey	·	1.9 km	MPC · JPL
501892	2014 WZ_{427}	—	October 6, 2008	Catalina	CSS	·	2.7 km	MPC · JPL
501893	2014 WE_{428}	—	January 12, 2002	Kitt Peak	Spacewatch	·	2.0 km	MPC · JPL
501894	2014 WS_{428}	—	January 16, 2007	Anderson Mesa	LONEOS	·	1.1 km	MPC · JPL
501895	2014 WX_{428}	—	April 2, 2005	Kitt Peak	Spacewatch	EOS	2.3 km	MPC · JPL
501896	2014 WE_{429}	—	November 26, 2009	Kitt Peak	Spacewatch	·	2.6 km	MPC · JPL
501897	2014 WL_{429}	—	February 27, 2006	Kitt Peak	Spacewatch	·	2.2 km	MPC · JPL
501898	2014 WR_{429}	—	September 3, 2008	Kitt Peak	Spacewatch	·	2.9 km	MPC · JPL
501899	2014 WM_{435}	—	October 7, 2004	Kitt Peak	Spacewatch	·	460 m	MPC · JPL
501900	2014 WJ_{437}	—	December 20, 2004	Mount Lemmon	Mount Lemmon Survey	V	620 m	MPC · JPL

== 501901–502000 ==
back to top

Designation			Discovery			Properties		Ref
Permanent	Provisional	Named after	Date	Site	Discoverer(s)	Category	Diam.	Ref
501901	2014 WE_{443}	—	March 15, 2012	Haleakala	Pan-STARRS 1	·	1.4 km	MPC · JPL
501902	2014 WG_{454}	—	September 10, 2007	Kitt Peak	Spacewatch	·	620 m	MPC · JPL
501903	2014 WE_{463}	—	November 10, 2009	Kitt Peak	Spacewatch	·	2.1 km	MPC · JPL
501904	2014 WV_{464}	—	October 5, 2007	Kitt Peak	Spacewatch	·	570 m	MPC · JPL
501905	2014 WH_{467}	—	January 19, 1999	Kitt Peak	Spacewatch	EOS	2.1 km	MPC · JPL
501906	2014 WO_{467}	—	August 19, 2004	Siding Spring	SSS	·	2.5 km	MPC · JPL
501907	2014 WY_{467}	—	March 16, 2004	Kitt Peak	Spacewatch	·	2.4 km	MPC · JPL
501908	2014 WF_{468}	—	March 10, 2011	Catalina	CSS	EUN	1.5 km	MPC · JPL
501909	2014 WP_{468}	—	December 3, 2008	Mount Lemmon	Mount Lemmon Survey	·	4.3 km	MPC · JPL
501910	2014 WY_{468}	—	November 27, 2014	Mount Lemmon	Mount Lemmon Survey	·	2.4 km	MPC · JPL
501911	2014 WD_{476}	—	October 20, 2007	Mount Lemmon	Mount Lemmon Survey	·	570 m	MPC · JPL
501912	2014 WU_{477}	—	March 4, 2011	Mount Lemmon	Mount Lemmon Survey	·	1.1 km	MPC · JPL
501913	2014 WP_{478}	—	November 28, 2014	Haleakala	Pan-STARRS 1	HNS	990 m	MPC · JPL
501914	2014 WY_{478}	—	December 29, 2008	Kitt Peak	Spacewatch	·	3.1 km	MPC · JPL
501915	2014 WJ_{479}	—	July 30, 2008	Kitt Peak	Spacewatch	·	2.2 km	MPC · JPL
501916	2014 WN_{479}	—	November 23, 2009	Kitt Peak	Spacewatch	EOS	2.7 km	MPC · JPL
501917	2014 WX_{479}	—	July 25, 2011	Haleakala	Pan-STARRS 1	TIR	3.2 km	MPC · JPL
501918	2014 WY_{479}	—	December 27, 2005	Kitt Peak	Spacewatch	·	1.8 km	MPC · JPL
501919	2014 WL_{480}	—	September 2, 2008	Kitt Peak	Spacewatch	EOS	2.5 km	MPC · JPL
501920	2014 WJ_{481}	—	September 14, 2013	Haleakala	Pan-STARRS 1	MAR	1.0 km	MPC · JPL
501921	2014 WU_{481}	—	November 18, 2009	Mount Lemmon	Mount Lemmon Survey	ADE	1.7 km	MPC · JPL
501922	2014 WA_{482}	—	November 20, 2007	Mount Lemmon	Mount Lemmon Survey	PHO	1.1 km	MPC · JPL
501923	2014 WG_{485}	—	September 16, 2003	Kitt Peak	Spacewatch	·	930 m	MPC · JPL
501924	2014 WK_{487}	—	December 13, 2010	Mount Lemmon	Mount Lemmon Survey	·	1.4 km	MPC · JPL
501925	2014 WP_{487}	—	March 5, 2011	Catalina	CSS	·	1.4 km	MPC · JPL
501926	2014 WH_{490}	—	April 16, 2008	Mount Lemmon	Mount Lemmon Survey	EUN	1.2 km	MPC · JPL
501927	2014 WE_{494}	—	February 6, 2011	Catalina	CSS	·	1.3 km	MPC · JPL
501928	2014 WL_{494}	—	February 25, 2011	Kitt Peak	Spacewatch	EUN	1.0 km	MPC · JPL
501929	2014 WS_{494}	—	September 24, 2013	Catalina	CSS	·	1.7 km	MPC · JPL
501930	2014 WT_{494}	—	March 27, 2011	Mount Lemmon	Mount Lemmon Survey	EUN	1.3 km	MPC · JPL
501931	2014 WJ_{496}	—	November 1, 2013	Mount Lemmon	Mount Lemmon Survey	·	2.3 km	MPC · JPL
501932	2014 WX_{504}	—	December 6, 2010	Catalina	CSS	·	1.2 km	MPC · JPL
501933	2014 WC_{506}	—	November 11, 2004	Kitt Peak	Spacewatch	·	610 m	MPC · JPL
501934	2014 XT_{3}	—	September 19, 2007	Catalina	CSS	AMO +1km	820 m	MPC · JPL
501935	2014 XO_{6}	—	September 4, 2014	Haleakala	Pan-STARRS 1	·	530 m	MPC · JPL
501936	2014 XE_{13}	—	October 2, 1999	Kitt Peak	Spacewatch	·	880 m	MPC · JPL
501937	2014 XZ_{14}	—	May 12, 2012	Haleakala	Pan-STARRS 1	EUN	1.8 km	MPC · JPL
501938	2014 XB_{17}	—	September 12, 2007	Catalina	CSS	·	810 m	MPC · JPL
501939	2014 XB_{29}	—	February 15, 2012	Haleakala	Pan-STARRS 1	·	750 m	MPC · JPL
501940	2014 XE_{37}	—	July 13, 2013	Haleakala	Pan-STARRS 1	·	1.0 km	MPC · JPL
501941	2014 XA_{38}	—	January 8, 2002	Socorro	LINEAR	·	1.7 km	MPC · JPL
501942	2014 XL_{38}	—	April 20, 2006	Kitt Peak	Spacewatch	·	2.3 km	MPC · JPL
501943	2014 XU_{38}	—	November 1, 2010	Catalina	CSS	MAS	630 m	MPC · JPL
501944	2014 XF_{39}	—	December 2, 2014	Haleakala	Pan-STARRS 1	·	750 m	MPC · JPL
501945	2014 YR_{2}	—	March 16, 2012	Kitt Peak	Spacewatch	·	710 m	MPC · JPL
501946	2014 YH_{3}	—	May 21, 2011	Mount Lemmon	Mount Lemmon Survey	·	2.6 km	MPC · JPL
501947	2014 YO_{3}	—	August 17, 2009	Kitt Peak	Spacewatch	·	1.4 km	MPC · JPL
501948	2014 YU_{3}	—	December 31, 2000	Kitt Peak	Spacewatch	·	2.7 km	MPC · JPL
501949	2014 YV_{3}	—	February 8, 2007	Kitt Peak	Spacewatch	·	1.4 km	MPC · JPL
501950	2014 YN_{4}	—	December 18, 2014	Haleakala	Pan-STARRS 1	·	1.8 km	MPC · JPL
501951	2014 YA_{5}	—	January 14, 2011	Mount Lemmon	Mount Lemmon Survey	·	2.2 km	MPC · JPL
501952	2014 YP_{5}	—	June 23, 2010	WISE	WISE	·	3.3 km	MPC · JPL
501953	2014 YA_{7}	—	November 20, 2014	Mount Lemmon	Mount Lemmon Survey	EUN	1.1 km	MPC · JPL
501954	2014 YB_{7}	—	November 4, 2005	Mount Lemmon	Mount Lemmon Survey	·	2.0 km	MPC · JPL
501955	2014 YF_{8}	—	October 3, 2013	Haleakala	Pan-STARRS 1	·	1.4 km	MPC · JPL
501956	2014 YC_{10}	—	December 13, 2004	Anderson Mesa	LONEOS	·	1.0 km	MPC · JPL
501957	2014 YK_{10}	—	June 21, 2007	Mount Lemmon	Mount Lemmon Survey	·	2.8 km	MPC · JPL
501958	2014 YY_{10}	—	January 17, 1998	Caussols	ODAS	EUN	1.2 km	MPC · JPL
501959	2014 YB_{11}	—	February 10, 2008	Mount Lemmon	Mount Lemmon Survey	NYS	1.0 km	MPC · JPL
501960	2014 YW_{11}	—	February 20, 2009	Kitt Peak	Spacewatch	·	590 m	MPC · JPL
501961	2014 YD_{13}	—	November 19, 2006	Kitt Peak	Spacewatch	MAS	850 m	MPC · JPL
501962	2014 YZ_{15}	—	March 10, 2008	Kitt Peak	Spacewatch	·	720 m	MPC · JPL
501963	2014 YJ_{16}	—	September 15, 2009	Catalina	CSS	·	1.9 km	MPC · JPL
501964	2014 YE_{20}	—	November 11, 2007	Mount Lemmon	Mount Lemmon Survey	·	660 m	MPC · JPL
501965	2014 YQ_{20}	—	April 22, 2004	Siding Spring	SSS	·	1.5 km	MPC · JPL
501966	2014 YJ_{21}	—	January 20, 2012	Haleakala	Pan-STARRS 1	·	1.5 km	MPC · JPL
501967	2014 YP_{21}	—	November 19, 2003	Anderson Mesa	LONEOS	·	1.0 km	MPC · JPL
501968	2014 YD_{22}	—	January 27, 2004	Kitt Peak	Spacewatch	·	2.5 km	MPC · JPL
501969	2014 YG_{22}	—	January 23, 2006	Kitt Peak	Spacewatch	·	2.1 km	MPC · JPL
501970	2014 YY_{22}	—	November 7, 2008	Mount Lemmon	Mount Lemmon Survey	·	2.6 km	MPC · JPL
501971	2014 YY_{23}	—	August 25, 2003	Cerro Tololo	Deep Ecliptic Survey	·	850 m	MPC · JPL
501972	2014 YE_{24}	—	January 1, 2008	Kitt Peak	Spacewatch	·	950 m	MPC · JPL
501973	2014 YG_{24}	—	February 11, 2002	Socorro	LINEAR	·	790 m	MPC · JPL
501974	2014 YX_{24}	—	December 15, 2004	Socorro	LINEAR	·	780 m	MPC · JPL
501975	2014 YT_{28}	—	September 12, 2013	Mount Lemmon	Mount Lemmon Survey	·	1.9 km	MPC · JPL
501976	2014 YV_{28}	—	September 17, 2006	Kitt Peak	Spacewatch	·	1.3 km	MPC · JPL
501977	2014 YE_{31}	—	October 19, 2001	Kitt Peak	Spacewatch	·	1.5 km	MPC · JPL
501978	2014 YL_{31}	—	March 2, 2011	Mount Lemmon	Mount Lemmon Survey	BRA	1.7 km	MPC · JPL
501979	2014 YN_{38}	—	November 17, 2008	Kitt Peak	Spacewatch	HYG	2.8 km	MPC · JPL
501980	2014 YR_{38}	—	November 17, 2009	Mount Lemmon	Mount Lemmon Survey	·	3.3 km	MPC · JPL
501981	2014 YT_{38}	—	November 20, 2006	Kitt Peak	Spacewatch	·	1.2 km	MPC · JPL
501982	2014 YN_{40}	—	December 18, 2003	Socorro	LINEAR	·	1.2 km	MPC · JPL
501983	2014 YJ_{41}	—	October 8, 2005	Kitt Peak	Spacewatch	·	1.3 km	MPC · JPL
501984	2014 YN_{41}	—	October 19, 2000	Kitt Peak	Spacewatch	·	580 m	MPC · JPL
501985	2014 YV_{42}	—	September 25, 2006	Mount Lemmon	Mount Lemmon Survey	·	1.1 km	MPC · JPL
501986	2014 YM_{43}	—	February 12, 2011	Catalina	CSS	·	2.2 km	MPC · JPL
501987	2014 YU_{45}	—	December 21, 2006	Catalina	CSS	·	1.5 km	MPC · JPL
501988	2014 YE_{48}	—	December 31, 2002	Socorro	LINEAR	·	1.5 km	MPC · JPL
501989	2015 AS_{2}	—	May 5, 2003	Kitt Peak	Spacewatch	·	1.6 km	MPC · JPL
501990	2015 AP_{3}	—	July 12, 2013	Haleakala	Pan-STARRS 1	·	660 m	MPC · JPL
501991	2015 AW_{9}	—	April 1, 2012	Mount Lemmon	Mount Lemmon Survey	·	610 m	MPC · JPL
501992	2015 AJ_{10}	—	October 1, 2013	Kitt Peak	Spacewatch	EOS	2.0 km	MPC · JPL
501993	2015 AF_{18}	—	December 8, 2010	Mount Lemmon	Mount Lemmon Survey	EUN	890 m	MPC · JPL
501994	2015 AW_{21}	—	September 23, 2008	Kitt Peak	Spacewatch	EOS	1.8 km	MPC · JPL
501995	2015 AP_{28}	—	January 10, 2008	Kitt Peak	Spacewatch	·	900 m	MPC · JPL
501996	2015 AY_{28}	—	March 9, 2008	Mount Lemmon	Mount Lemmon Survey	·	1.5 km	MPC · JPL
501997	2015 AZ_{28}	—	May 14, 2010	WISE	WISE	·	2.3 km	MPC · JPL
501998	2015 AV_{29}	—	January 23, 2006	Mount Lemmon	Mount Lemmon Survey	AGN	910 m	MPC · JPL
501999	2015 AN_{30}	—	January 30, 2006	Kitt Peak	Spacewatch	·	1.7 km	MPC · JPL
502000	2015 AA_{33}	—	November 14, 2001	Kitt Peak	Spacewatch	·	710 m	MPC · JPL

back to top

== Meaning of names ==
As minor planet discoveries are confirmed, they are given a permanent number by the IAU's Minor Planet Center (MPC), and the discoverers can then submit names for them, following the IAU's naming conventions. The list below concerns those minor planets in the specified number-range that have received names, and explains the meanings of those names.

Official naming citations of newly named small Solar System bodies are approved and published in a bulletin by IAU's Working Group for Small Bodies Nomenclature (WGSBN). Before May 2021, citations were published in MPC's Minor Planet Circulars for many decades. Recent citations can also be found on the JPL Small-Body Database (SBDB). Until his death in 2016, German astronomer Lutz D. Schmadel compiled these citations into the Dictionary of Minor Planet Names (DMP) and regularly updated the collection.

Based on Paul Herget's The Names of the Minor Planets, Schmadel also researched the unclear origin of numerous asteroids, most of which had been named prior to World War II. This article incorporates text from this source, which is in the public domain: SBDB New namings may only be added to this list below after official publication as the preannouncement of names is condemned. The WGSBN publishes a comprehensive guideline for the naming rules of non-cometary small Solar System bodies.

Named minor planet	Provisional	This minor planet was named for...	Ref · Catalog
501132 Runkel	2013 TJ_{35}	Runkel, a German town in the Lahn Valley. Name suggested by students from the Johann-Christian-Senckenberg School in Germany.	JPL · 501132
