= (501647) 2014 SD224 =

Near-Earth asteroid

(501647) 2014 SD_{224}
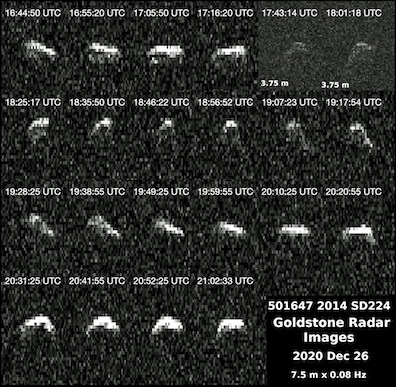
- Collage of radar images taken by Goldstone on 26 December 2020

Discovery
- Discovered by: Pan-STARRS
- Discovery date: 22 September 2014

Designations
- Minor planet category: Aten; NEO

Orbital characteristics
- Epoch 2020-May-31 (JD 2459000.5)
- Uncertainty parameter 1
- Observation arc: 6.3 years
- Aphelion: 1.3015 AU
- Perihelion: 0.65406
- Semi-major axis: 0.97779 AU
- Eccentricity: 0.33107
- Orbital period (sidereal): 353.15 days (0.97 years)
- Mean anomaly: 75.398°
- Inclination: 4.5484°
- Longitude of ascending node: 286.44°
- Argument of perihelion: 277.11°
- Earth MOID: 0.017 AU (2.5 million km)
- Venus MOID: 0.024 AU (3.6 million km)
- Jupiter MOID: 3.66 AU (548 million km)

Physical characteristics
- Mean diameter: 92–210 meters (CNEOS); ~150 m (490 ft)
- Absolute magnitude (H): 22.3

(501647) 2014 SD_{224} is an Aten-type near-Earth asteroid around 150 meters (490 feet) in diameter. It was discovered on 22 September 2014 when the asteroid was 0.29 AU (43 million km; 110 LD) from Earth and had a solar elongation of 123 degrees. The glare of the Sun had masked the approach of the asteroid as it passed closest approach to Earth on 11 August 2014. (Note: The asteroid was within 60 degrees of the Sun from February 2014 until 9 August 2014 04:11 UT.) The asteroid now has a 6-year observation arc and a well-determined orbit. It also makes close approaches to Venus.

== 2020 ==
2014 SD_{224} was less than 90 degrees from the Sun until September 2020 when it still had a very faint apparent magnitude of 24. The asteroid was recovered on 22 November 2020 by Mt. Lemmon Survey. The asteroid came to opposition (opposite the Sun in the sky) on 12 December 2020 when it had a solar elongation of 149 degrees and a magnitude of 18. It reached a peak brightness on 23 December 2020 at magnitude 16.4, which is still fainter than Pluto.

The asteroid safely passed closest approach to Earth on 25 December 2020 at 20:20 UT at a distance of 0.02 AU (3.0 million km; 7.8 LD). The 2020 close approach distance is known with an accuracy of roughly ±20 km.
