= End Day =

2005 British television docudrama

- Genre: Docudrama; Disaster movie
- Written by: Gareth Edwards
- Directed by: Gareth Edwards
- Starring: Glenn Conroy
- Composer: Gavin Skinner
- Country of origin: United Kingdom
- Original language: English

Production
- Executive producer: Deborah Cadbury
- Running time: 48 minutes

End Day is a 2005 docu-drama produced by the BBC. It aired on the National Geographic Channel, on the TV series National Geographic Channel Presents, and BBC Three. It depicts a set of five doomsday scenarios. The documentary follows the fictional scientist Dr. Howell, played by Glenn Conroy, as he travels from his London hotel room to his laboratory in New York City, and shows how each scenario affects his journey as well as those around him, with various experts providing commentary on that specific disaster as it unfolds. After each 'End Day' runs its course, the day repeats, this time with the next scenario panning out.

The following descriptions of the program were released by the BBC:

"Imagine waking up to the last day on Earth..."

"Inspired by the predictions of scientists, End Day creates apocalyptic scenarios that go beyond reality. In a single hour, explore five different fictional disasters, from a giant tsunami hitting New York to a deadly meteorite strike on Berlin."

== Scenarios ==
=== Mega-Tsunami ===
A volcanic eruption of Cumbre Vieja on the island of La Palma in the Canary Islands triggers a massive landslide. A sizable portion of the island collapses into the sea, causing a massive tsunami, 500 feet (150 m) tall, to race across the Atlantic Ocean. The United States Navy searches for the wave and locates it, predicting that the mega-tsunami will strike the East Coast of the United States. An evacuation of New York City is ordered but not completed by the time the wave arrives and inundates the city, killing thousands of people but leaving many sturdier buildings intact, which proved to be crucial in providing a means of escape. A briefing by the US government after the flood waters started receding reveals that the wave travelled over two miles inland. Despite the vast amount of casualties, a substantial number of New York citizens survive the disaster by climbing to the upper floors of tall buildings, which were able to withstand the force of the tsunami.

=== Killer Meteorite ===
This scenario begins with a suspected missile attack in a remote area of the Middle East. The missiles are soon revealed to be a meteor shower of meteoroids, the advance guard of a much larger asteroid that is predicted to impact Berlin, Germany. After determining the asteroid's size and orbital characteristics, the militaries of Germany, Britain, and the United States attempt to alter its course using ICBMs. The asteroid is shattered into hundreds of fragments, but the effort fails to alter its course. An evacuation of Berlin is achieved with public transport; citizens unable to escape seek shelter in the city's U-Bahn stations. As fragments rain down across Berlin, one train manages to escape just in time to avoid the largest fragment striking and destroying a large portion of the city's centre, leaving an impact crater where the Reichstag building once stood.

=== Global Pandemic ===
In this scenario, a variant of influenza named the "Far East Virus" with similarities to SARS spreads to the UK after its patient zero travels from Hong Kong to London, then infects people on a London Underground train. The virus rapidly spreads across Europe and beyond without any containment, developing into a pandemic. Areas of the UK are placed under quarantine. Countries around the world enact martial law and close their borders in an effort to slow the spread of the disease. These efforts fail, and the outbreak reaches the scale of the 1918-20 Spanish flu pandemic, killing millions of people.

=== Supervolcano ===
The supervolcano beneath Yellowstone National Park begins to become active, showing the initial signs of activity through volcanic earthquakes in Wyoming. Volcanic activity increases in the area at an exponential rate, indicating that an eruption is imminent. A geyser and then Yellowstone itself explodes, incinerating everything within 100 kilometres of the caldera. The volcanic ash launched into the atmosphere grounds civil aviation across Europe and North America and is expected to bring about a volcanic winter. Survivors emerge from the wreckage of Denver, the city scorched by pyroclastic and lava flows.

==== Note ====
This segment has only aired in the UK. The BBC docudrama Supervolcano explored this scenario more in-depth.

=== Strange Matter ===
Dr. Howell reaches the laboratory unimpeded, and is tasked with carrying out an experiment using the world's largest particle accelerator. The experiment goes wrong, resulting in the creation of a strangelet, a hypothetical particle containing strange quarks that is capable of converting ordinary matter into strange matter. The strangelet causes the particle accelerator to explode, then rises to the surface, converting the entirety of New York City and wreaking havoc on Earth's atmosphere, triggering vast storm systems to form. Paris is devoured by one such storm system, and the strange matter continues to spread exponentially. Off-screen, the strangelet finishes consuming and converting the planet into a sphere of pure strange matter. Ironically, by preventing Dr. Howell from reaching the particle accelerator, each of the other potential disasters inadvertently saved the Earth from total destruction.

This episode is based on the story of the Large Hadron Collider project, which, at the time, was scheduled to launch on September 10, 2008 — three years before the premiere of the BBC’s The End of the World. Nine days later, an accident occurred, but the world did not come to an end.

== Alternative versions ==
All original official sources cite five different scenarios including a giant volcanic explosion, but the volcanic explosion segment has never been aired in the United States, having been edited out by the National Geographic Channel, possibly for time problems or the inaccurate depiction of the Western United States and Yellowstone park. All references to it on the National Geographic website have been removed. Only the other four scenarios have been aired. However, the BBC website had the super volcano segment until it was removed some time after 28 May 2006. UKTV History aired the version including the supervolcano segment on 23 January 2007. However, in the original BBC airing, each of the scenarios showed the attempts of a family or person to escape the depicted disaster, as well as following Dr. Howell; these segments were mostly cut from the UKTV History version aired in 2007. The volcano sequence can however be found on the popular video website YouTube.

A French-dubbed version of End Day was aired in France on W9) and in Belgium (on RTBF), under the title Fin du monde : les quatre scénarios (End day: the four scenarios). The "super volcano" scenario was not included.

== References in the film ==
The program's opening uses the theme music to Close Encounters of the Third Kind.

When Dr. Howell drives off in a taxi at the beginning of the second segment, a cinema showing "Groundhog Day appears. In Groundhog Day, the protagonist is stuck in a single day of his life, repeating it time after time with minor variations.

The Science Today magazine, featuring Dr. Howell, mentions other segments' subjects on its cover ("Plus: Flu Epidemic reaches Europe" "Also: Yellowstone - Trouble Brewing?").

== See also ==
- Extinction event
- Near-Earth object
