= Continent of stability =

Hypothetical collection of stable heavy nuclides

The continent of stability is a hypothesised large group of nuclides with masses greater than 300 daltons that is stable against radioactive decay, consisting of freely flowing up quarks and down quarks rather than up and down quarks bound into protons and neutrons. Matter containing these nuclides is termed up-down quark matter (udQM). The continent of stability is named in analogy with the island of stability. However, if it exists, the range of charge and mass will be much greater than in the island. Quark matter composed of up quarks and down quarks is predicted to be a lower energy state than that which contains strange quarks (strange quark matter), and also lower than the combination of quarks in the form of hadrons found in normal atomic nuclei if there are over 300 protons and neutrons. The lower limit of 300 was calculated based on a surface tension model, where the surface has a higher energy than the interior of the piece of quark matter. In order to be the absolutely more stable form, the energy must be lower than that of the most stable normal matter, that is 930 MeV per baryon. If these quark matter nuclides exist, they would be stable against fission, as fission would increase the surface. The quark matter nuclide could absorb neutrons resulting in an increase in its mass.

The electric charge of up-down quark matter: full result (blue dots) and the bulk approximation (blue line). The shaded region is the continent of stability.

The boundary to the continent of stability is determined by the situations where the Coulomb energy due to electric charge overcomes the binding energy, or where decay into atomic nuclei results in lower energy. The lowest energy mass number is proportional to the cube of the charge (atomic number). However, a range of charges is stable for each mass, and the range increases as the mass increases. This can result in very heavy nuclides with atomic numbers the same as existing known elements, and even zero-charge pieces of quark matter.

A proposed alternative form of quark matter known as strangelets contains strange quarks in addition to the up and down quarks. This would be neutral in charge, and thus not form atoms. udQM is probably lower energy than strangelets (uds-matter).

At CERN's Large Hadron Collider, the ATLAS Collaboration is attempting to observe this kind of matter.

Doubts emerged in 2025 about the stability of quark matter were subsequently overcome.

== Other properties ==
Electron-positron pairs will form in the high charge field via the Schwinger mechanism when the electric charge of udQM is larger than 163, at which the baryon number is 609. The smallest stable udQM against neutron emission would be at baryon number 39.

== Formation in nature ==
udQM could be possibly formed during a supernova core collapse from conversion of superheavy nuclei. In this environment there is a high density of electrons and electron neutrinos present. The udQM would then end up in neutron stars. udQM nuclides may be detectable in cosmic rays.

A star containing a large proportion of udQM is called a ud quark star (or udQS). Heavy neutron stars may convert into this star type. Whether they do may be verified by detecting binary compact stellar collisions via gravitational waves.
