= Strange star =

Type of star

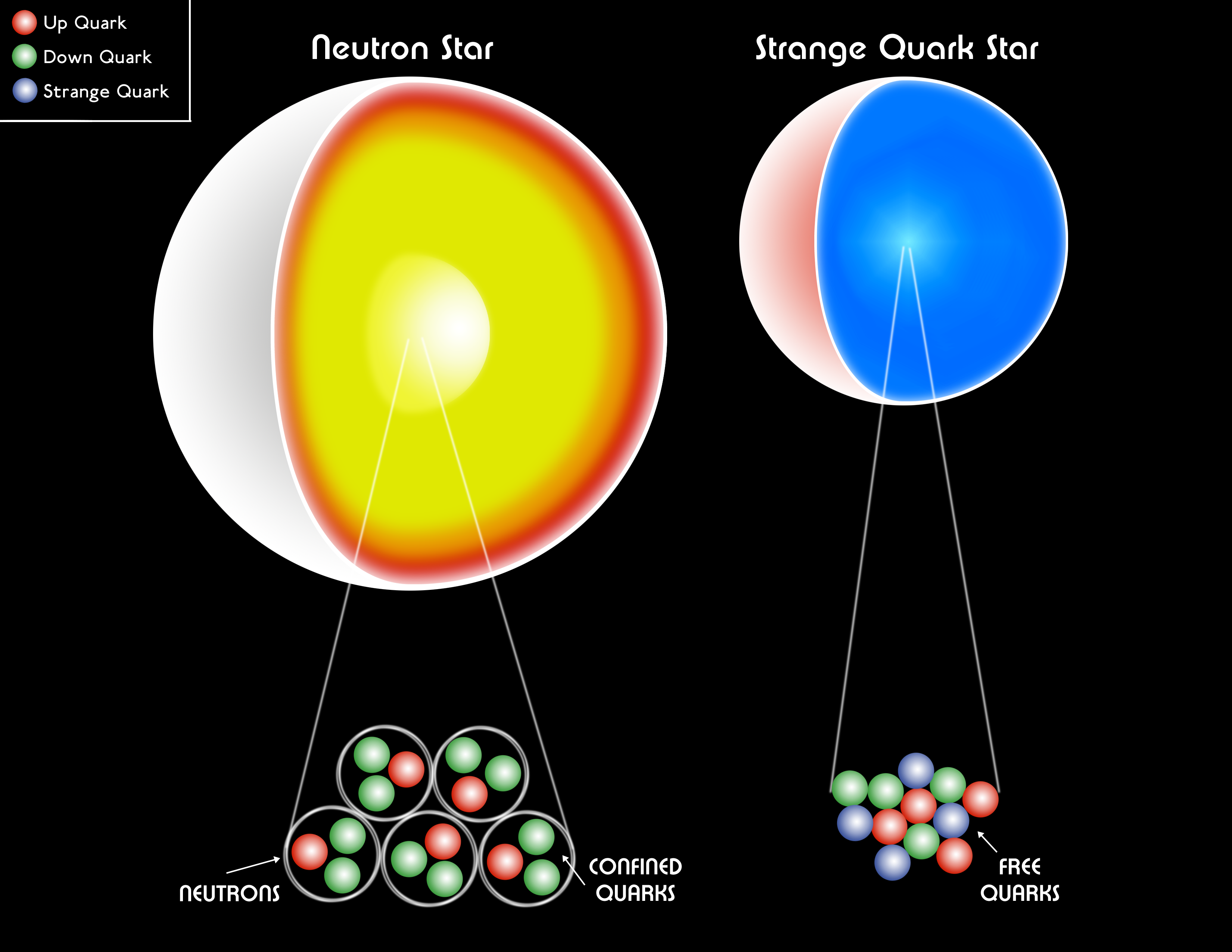
Concept of a neutron star vs a strange-quark star

A strange star, also called a strange quark star, is a hypothetical compact astronomical object, a quark star made of strange quark matter.

Strange stars might exist without regard to the Bodmer–Witten assumption of stability at near-zero temperatures and pressures, as strange quark matter might form and remain stable at the core of neutron stars, in the same way as ordinary quark matter could. Such strange stars will naturally have a crust layer of neutron matter. The depth of the crust layer will depend on the physical conditions and circumstances of the entire star and on the properties of strange quark matter in general. Stars partially made up of quark matter (including strange quark matter) are also referred to as hybrid stars.

The collapse of the crust layer of strange stars is one of the proposed causes of fast radio bursts.

== Theoretical description ==
Neutron stars are formed when the collapse of a star occurs with such intense force that gravity forces subatomic particles such as protons and electrons to merge into neutrally charged neutron particles, releasing a shower of neutrinos. If the resultant neutral core is able to maintain form and not collapse into a black hole, the result is an incredibly dense celestial body composed almost entirely of uncharged particles.

Protons and neutrons are composed of three quarks: a proton by two up quarks and one down quark, a neutron by two down quarks and one up quark. It is hypothesized that within neutron stars, the conditions are so extreme that a process known as deconfinement occurs: where subatomic particles dissolve and leave their constituent quarks behind as free particles. The temperature and pressure would then force these quarks to be squeezed together to such an extent that they would form a hypothetical phase of matter known as quark matter. If this occurs, the neutron star becomes a "quark star". If the pressure is great enough, the quarks could be affected even further and a portion could transform into strange quarks, which would then interact with the other "non-strange" quarks to form strange matter. If this occurs, the quark star would then become a strange star.

== Characteristics ==
Early work on strange quark matter suggested that it would be a homogeneous liquid, but other models propose a heterogeneous alternative with positively charged "strange quark nuggets" embedded in a negatively charged electron gas. This structure decreases the stars' external electric field and density variation from previous theoretical expectations, with the result that such stars appear nearly indistinguishable from ordinary neutron stars.

Other theoretical work contends that:

A sharp interface between quark matter and the vacuum would have very different properties from the surface of a neutron star.

Addressing key parameters like surface tension and electrical forces that were neglected in the original study, the results show that as long as the surface tension is below a low critical value, the large strangelets are indeed unstable to fragmentation and strange stars naturally come with complex strangelet crusts, analogous to those of neutron stars.

== Crust collapse ==
For a strange star's crust to collapse, it must accrete matter from its environment in some form.

The energy release from even small amounts of matter causes a cascading effect on the star's crust. This is thought to include in the initial phases of the very short collapsing stage a massive release of electron-positron pairs with magnetic energy that directs the charges towards the poles of the strange star then ejects them at relativistic velocities, which is proposed to be one of the causes of fast radio bursts.

== Primordial strange stars ==
Theoretical investigations have revealed that quark stars might not only be produced from neutron stars and powerful supernovae, they could also be created in the early cosmic phase separations following the Big Bang, similar to hypothetical primordial black holes.

If these primordial quark stars can transform into strange quark matter before the external temperature and pressure conditions of the early universe renders them unstable, they might become stable, if the Bodmer–Witten assumption holds true. Such primordial strange stars could survive to this day.

== Strange dwarf stars ==
Hypothetical strange-quark dwarfs would be white dwarf stars with strange-quark cores. Some studies predict these objects would be stable, while others predict instability. A survey examined the mass–radius relation for 40,000 white dwarfs and found eight exceptions were much smaller in size and matched predictions for a strange dwarf.

== See also ==
- Stellar classification
- Exotic star
