= Color superconductivity =

Predicted phase in quark matter

Color superconductivity is a phenomenon where matter carries color charge without loss, analogous to the way conventional superconductors can carry electric charge without loss. Color superconductivity is predicted to occur in quark matter if the baryon density is sufficiently high (i.e., well above the density and energies of an atomic nucleus) and the temperature is not too high (well below 10^{12} kelvins). Color superconducting phases are to be contrasted with the normal phase of quark matter, which is just a weakly interacting Fermi liquid of quarks.

In theoretical terms, a color superconducting phase is a state in which the quarks near the Fermi surface become correlated in Cooper pairs, which condense. In phenomenological terms, a color superconducting phase breaks some of the symmetries of the underlying theory, and has a very different spectrum of excitations and very different transport properties from the normal phase.

== Description ==
=== Analogy with superconducting metals ===
It is well known that at low temperature many metals become superconductors. A metal can be viewed in part as a Fermi liquid of electrons, and below a critical temperature, an attractive phonon-mediated interaction between the electrons near the Fermi surface causes them to pair up and form a condensate of Cooper pairs, which via the Anderson–Higgs mechanism makes the photon massive, leading to characteristic behaviors of a superconductor: infinite conductivity and the exclusion of magnetic fields (Meissner effect). The crucial ingredients for this to occur are:

1. a liquid of charged fermions.
2. an attractive interaction between the fermions
3. low temperature (below the critical temperature)

These ingredients are also present in sufficiently dense quark matter, leading physicists to expect that something similar will happen in that context:

1. quarks carry both electric charge and color charge;
2. the strong interaction between two quarks is powerfully attractive;
3. the critical temperature is expected to be given by the QCD scale, which is of order 100 MeV, or 10^{12} kelvins, the temperature of the universe a few minutes after the Big Bang, so quark matter that we may currently observe in compact stars or other natural settings will be below this temperature.

The fact that a Cooper pair of quarks carries a net color charge, as well as a net electric charge, means that some of the gluons (which mediate the strong interaction just as photons mediate electromagnetism) become massive in a phase with a condensate of quark Cooper pairs, so such a phase is called a "color superconductor". Actually, in many color superconducting phases the photon itself does not become massive, but mixes with one of the gluons to yield a new massless "rotated photon". This is an MeV-scale echo of the mixing of the hypercharge and W_{3} bosons that originally yielded the photon at the TeV scale of electroweak symmetry breaking.

=== Diversity of color superconducting phases ===
Unlike an electrical superconductor, color-superconducting quark matter comes in many varieties, each of which is a separate phase of matter. This is because quarks, unlike electrons, come in many species. There are three different colors (red, green, blue) and in the core of a compact star we expect three different flavors (up, down, strange), making nine species in all. Thus in forming the Cooper pairs there is a 9×9 color-flavor matrix of possible pairing patterns. The differences between these patterns are very physically significant: different patterns break different symmetries of the underlying theory, leading to different excitation spectra and different transport properties.

It is very hard to predict which pairing patterns will be favored in nature. In principle this question could be decided by a QCD calculation, since QCD is the theory that fully describes the strong interaction. In the limit of infinite density, where the strong interaction becomes weak because of asymptotic freedom, controlled calculations can be performed, and it is known that the favored phase in three-flavor quark matter is the color-flavor-locked phase. But at the densities that exist in nature these calculations are unreliable, and the only known alternative is the brute-force computational approach of lattice QCD, which unfortunately has a technical difficulty (the "sign problem") that renders it useless for calculations at high quark density and low temperature.

Physicists are currently pursuing the following lines of research on color superconductivity:

- Performing calculations in the infinite density limit, to get some idea of the behavior at one edge of the phase diagram.
- Performing calculations of the phase structure down to medium density using a highly simplified model of QCD, the Nambu–Jona-Lasinio (NJL) model, which is not a controlled approximation, but is expected to yield semi-quantitative insights.
- Writing down an effective theory for the excitations of a given phase, and using it to calculate the physical properties of that phase.
- Performing astrophysical calculations, using NJL models or effective theories, to see if there are observable signatures by which one could confirm or rule out the presence of specific color superconducting phases in nature (i.e. in compact stars: see next section).

== Possible occurrence in nature ==
The only known place in the universe where the baryon density might possibly be high enough to produce quark matter, and the temperature is low enough for color superconductivity to occur, is the core of a compact star (often called a "neutron star", a term which prejudges the question of its actual makeup). There are many open questions here:

- We do not know the critical density at which there would be a phase transition from nuclear matter to some form of quark matter, so we do not know whether compact stars have quark matter cores or not.
- On the other extreme, it is conceivable that nuclear matter in bulk is actually metastable, and decays into quark matter (the "stable strange matter hypothesis"). In this case, compact stars would consist completely of quark matter all the way to their surface.
- Assuming that compact stars do contain quark matter, we do not know whether that quark matter is in a color superconducting phase or not. At infinite density one expects color superconductivity, and the attractive nature of the dominant strong quark-quark interaction leads one to expect that it will survive down to lower densities, but there may be a transition to some strongly coupled phase (e.g. a Bose–Einstein condensate of spatially bound colored di- or colorless hexaquarks).

== See also ==
- QCD matter – Hypothetical phases of matter
- Fermionic condensate – State of matter
- SU(2) color superconductivity – Property of quark matter
