= Hidden states of matter =

State of matter which cannot be reached under ergodic conditions

A hidden state of matter is a state of matter which cannot be reached under ergodic conditions, and is therefore distinct from known thermodynamic phases of the material. Examples exist in condensed matter systems, and are typically reached by the non-ergodic conditions created through laser photoexcitation. Short-lived hidden states of matter have also been reported in crystals using lasers. Recently a persistent hidden state was discovered in a crystal of Tantalum(IV) sulfide (TaS_{2}), where the state is stable at low temperatures. A hidden state of matter is not to be confused with hidden order, which exists in equilibrium, but is not immediately apparent or easily observed.

Using ultrashort laser pulses impinging on solid state matter, the system may be knocked out of equilibrium so that not only are the individual subsystems out of equilibrium with each other but also internally. Under such conditions, new states of matter may be created which are not otherwise reachable under equilibrium, ergodic system evolution. Such states are usually unstable and decay very rapidly, typically in nanoseconds or less. The difficulty is in distinguishing a genuine hidden state from one which is simply out of thermal equilibrium.

Probably the first instance of a photoinduced state is described for the organic molecular compound TTF-CA, which turns from neutral to ionic species as a result of excitation by laser pulses. However, a similar transformation is also possible by the application of pressure, so strictly speaking the photoinduced transition is not to a hidden state under the definition given in the introductory paragraph. A few further examples are given in ref. Photoexcitation has been shown to produce persistent states in vanadates and manganite materials, leading to filamentary paths of a modified charge ordered phase which is sustained by a passing current. Transient superconductivity was also reported in cuprates.

== A photoexcited transition to an H state ==
A hypothetical schematic diagram for the transition to an H state by photoexcitation is shown in the Figure (After). An absorbed photon causes an electron from the ground state G to an excited state E (red arrow). State E rapidly relaxes via Franck-Condon relaxation to an intermediate locally reordered state I. Through interactions with others of its kind, this state collectively orders to form a macroscopically ordered metastable state H, further lowering its energy as a result. The new state has a broken symmetry with respect to the G or E state, and may also involve further relaxation compared to the I state. The barrier E_{B} prevents state H from reverting to the ground state G. If the barrier is sufficiently large compared to thermal energy k_{B}T, where k_{B} is the Boltzmann constant, the H state can be stable indefinitely.

A photo excited transition from a ground state to a hidden state typically involves two intermediate states
