= Color–flavor locking =

Phenomenon in high-density strange matter

Color–flavor locking (CFL) is a phenomenon that is expected to occur in ultra-high-density strange matter, a form of quark matter. The quarks form Cooper pairs, whose color properties are correlated with their flavor properties in a one-to-one correspondence between three color pairs and three flavor pairs. According to the Standard Model of particle physics, the color-flavor-locked phase is the highest-density phase of three-flavor colored matter.

== Color-flavor-locked Cooper pairing ==
If each quark is represented as $\psi^\alpha_i$, with color index $\alpha$ taking values 1, 2, 3 corresponding to red, green, and blue, and flavor index $i$ taking values 1, 2, 3 corresponding to up, down, and strange, then the color-flavor-locked pattern of Cooper pairing is

$$\langle \psi^\alpha_i C \gamma_5 \psi^\beta_j \rangle
\propto \delta^\alpha_i\delta^\beta_j - \delta^\alpha_j\delta^\beta_i
= \epsilon^{\alpha\beta A}\epsilon_{ij A}$$

This means that a Cooper pair of an up quark and a down quark must have colors red and green, and so on. This pairing pattern is special because it leaves a large unbroken symmetry group.

== Physical properties ==
The CFL phase is predicted to have several remarkable properties:

- It breaks chiral symmetry.
- It is a superfluid.
- It is an electromagnetic insulator, in which there is a "rotated" photon, containing a small admixture of one of the gluons.
- It has the same symmetries as sufficiently dense hyperonic matter.

There are several variants of the CFL phase, representing distortions of the pairing structure in response to external stresses such as a difference between the mass of the strange quark and the mass of the up and down quarks.

== See also ==
- Color superconductivity
