= QCD matter =

Hypothetical phases of matter

Quark matter or QCD matter (quantum chromodynamic matter) refers to any of a number of hypothetical phases of matter built from quarks and gluons, of which the prominent example is quark-gluon plasma. At different temperatures and densities quark matter takes different forms, including a hadron gas, nuclear matter, quark-gluon plasma, and regions of color superconductivity.

Quarks are liberated into quark matter at extremely high temperatures and/or densities, and some of them are still only theoretical as they require conditions so extreme that they cannot be produced in any laboratory, especially not at equilibrium conditions. Under these extreme conditions, the familiar structure of matter, where the basic constituents are nuclei (consisting of nucleons which are bound states of quarks) and electrons, is disrupted. In quark matter it is more appropriate to treat the quarks themselves as the basic degrees of freedom.

In the Standard Model of particle physics, the strong force is described by the theory of QCD. At ordinary temperatures or densities this force just confines the quarks into composite particles (hadrons) of size around 10^{−15} m = 1 femtometer = 1 fm (corresponding to the QCD energy scale Λ_{QCD} ≈ 200 MeV) and its effects are not noticeable at longer distances.

However, when the temperature reaches the QCD energy scale (T of order 10^{12} kelvins) or the density rises to the point where the average inter-quark separation is less than 1 fm (quark chemical potential μ around 400 MeV), the hadrons are melted into their constituent quarks, and the strong interaction becomes the dominant feature of the physics. Such phases are called quark matter or QCD matter.

The strength of the color force makes the properties of quark matter unlike gas or plasma, instead leading to a state of matter more reminiscent of a liquid. At high densities, quark matter is a Fermi liquid, but is predicted to exhibit color superconductivity at high densities and temperatures below 10^{12} K.

Unsolved problem in physics
QCD in the non-perturbative regime: quark matter. The equations of QCD predict that a sea of quarks and gluons should be formed at high temperature and density. What are the properties of this phase of matter?
More unsolved problems in physics

== Occurrence ==
=== Natural occurrence ===
- According to the Big Bang theory, in the early universe at high temperatures when the universe was only a few tens of microseconds old, matter took the form of a hot phase of quark matter called the quark–gluon plasma (QGP).
- Compact stars (neutron stars). A neutron star is much cooler than 10^{12} K, but gravitational collapse has compressed it to such high densities, that it is reasonable to surmise that quark matter may exist in the core. Hypothetical compact stars composed mostly or entirely of quark matter are called quark stars or strange stars.
- QCD matter may exist within the collapsar of a gamma-ray burst, where temperatures as high as 6.7 × 10^{13} K may be generated.

At this time no star with properties expected of these objects has been observed, although some evidence has been provided for quark matter in the cores of large neutron stars.

- Strangelets. These are theoretically postulated (but as yet unobserved) lumps of strange matter comprising nearly equal amounts of up, down and strange quarks. Strangelets are supposed to be present in the galactic flux of high energy particles and should therefore theoretically be detectable in cosmic rays here on Earth, but no strangelet has been detected with certainty.
- Cosmic ray impacts. Cosmic rays comprise a lot of different particles, including highly accelerated atomic nuclei, particularly that of iron.

Laboratory experiments suggest that the inevitable interaction with heavy noble gas nuclei in the upper atmosphere would lead to quark–gluon plasma formation.

- Quark matter with baryon number over about 300 may be more stable than nuclear matter. This form of baryonic matter could possibly form a continent of stability.

=== Laboratory experiments ===
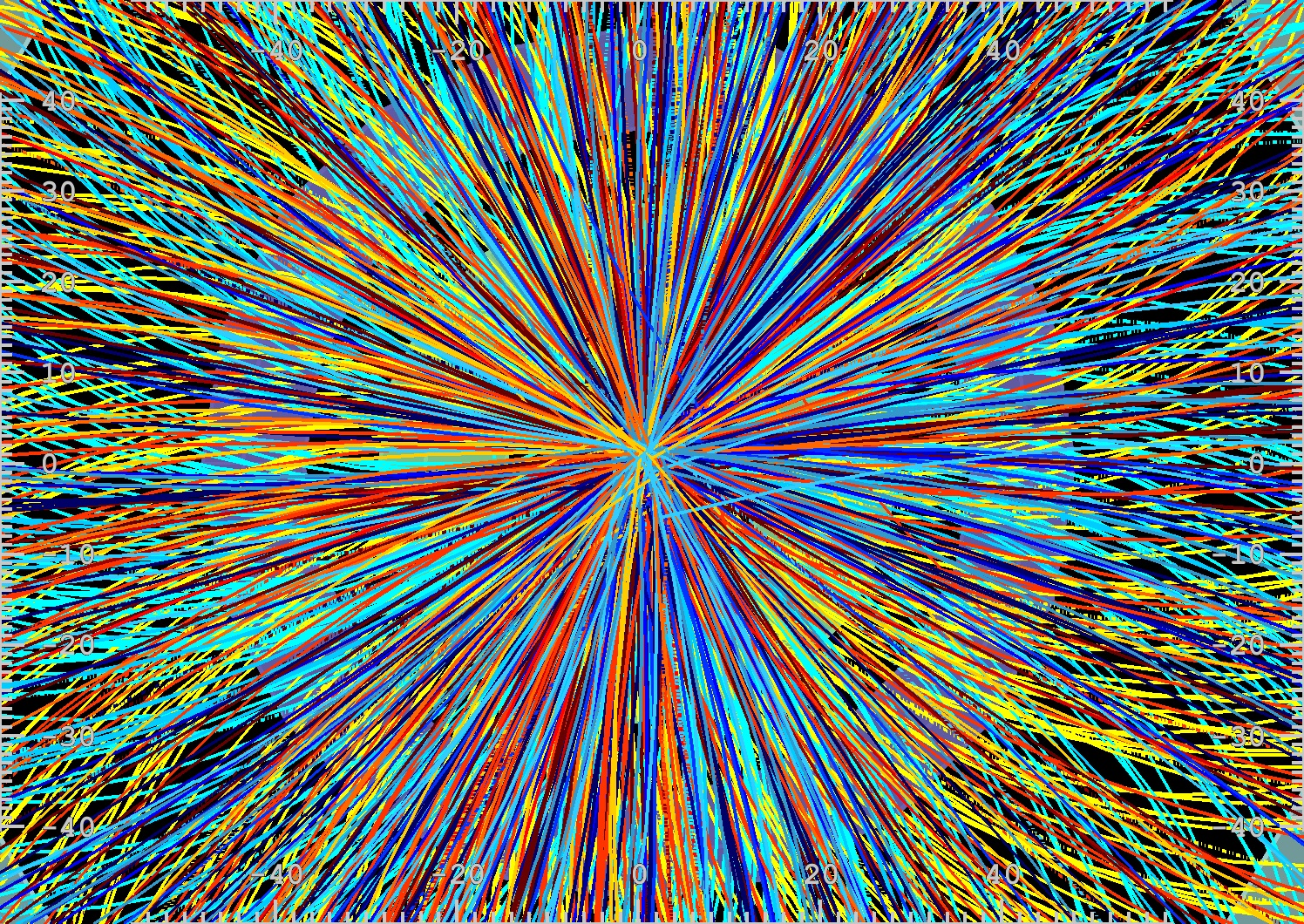
Particle debris trajectories from one of the first lead-ion collisions with the LHC, as recorded by the ALICE detector. The extremely brief appearance of quark matter in the point of collision is inferred from the statistics of the trajectories.

Even though quark-gluon plasma can only occur under quite extreme conditions of temperature and/or pressure, it is being actively studied at particle colliders, such as the Large Hadron Collider LHC at CERN and the Relativistic Heavy Ion Collider RHIC at Brookhaven National Laboratory.

In these collisions, the plasma only occurs for a very short time before it spontaneously disintegrates. The plasma's physical characteristics are studied by detecting the debris emanating from the collision region with large particle detectors.

Heavy-ion collisions at very high energies can produce small short-lived regions of space whose energy density is comparable to that of the 20-micro-second-old universe. This has been achieved by colliding heavy nuclei such as lead nuclei at high speeds, and a first time claim of formation of quark–gluon plasma came from the SPS accelerator at CERN in February 2000.

This work has been continued at more powerful accelerators, such as RHIC in the US, and as of 2010 at the European LHC at CERN located in the border area of Switzerland and France. There is good evidence that the quark–gluon plasma has also been produced at RHIC.

== Thermodynamics ==
The context for understanding the thermodynamics of quark matter is the Standard Model of particle physics, which contains six different flavors of quarks, as well as leptons like electrons and neutrinos. These interact via the strong interaction, electromagnetism, and also the weak interaction which allows one flavor of quark to turn into another. Electromagnetic interactions occur between particles that carry electrical charge; strong interactions occur between particles that carry color charge.

The correct thermodynamic treatment of quark matter depends on the physical context. For large quantities that exist for long periods of time (the "thermodynamic limit"), we must take into account the fact that the only conserved charges in the Standard Model are quark number (equivalent to baryon number), electric charge, the eight color charges, and lepton number. Each of these can have an associated chemical potential. However, large volumes of matter must be electrically and color-neutral, which determines the electric and color charge chemical potentials. This leaves a three-dimensional phase space, parameterized by quark chemical potential, lepton chemical potential, and temperature.

In compact stars quark matter would occupy cubic kilometers and exist for millions of years, so the thermodynamic limit is appropriate. However, the neutrinos escape, violating lepton number, so the phase space for quark matter in compact stars only has two dimensions, temperature (T) and quark number chemical potential μ. A strangelet is not in the thermodynamic limit of large volume, so it is like an exotic nucleus: it may carry electric charge.

A heavy-ion collision is in neither the thermodynamic limit of large volumes nor long times. Putting aside questions of whether it is sufficiently equilibrated for thermodynamics to be applicable, there is certainly not enough time for weak interactions to occur, so flavor is conserved, and there are independent chemical potentials for all six quark flavors. The initial conditions (the impact parameter of the collision, the number of up and down quarks in the colliding nuclei, and the fact that they contain no quarks of other flavors) determine the chemical potentials. (Reference for this section:).

== Phase diagram ==
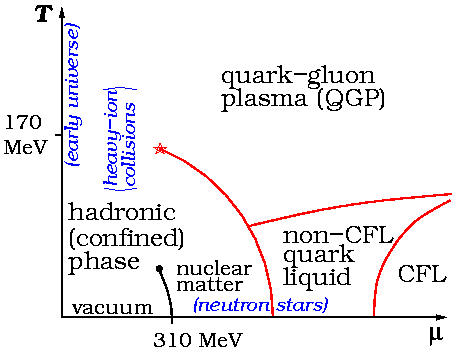
Conjectured form of the phase diagram of QCD matter, with temperature on the vertical axis and quark chemical potential on the horizontal axis, both in mega-electron volts.

Based on rigorous theoretical calculations valid at ultrahigh density and a few experimental ultrarelativistic heavy ion collision experiments, an outline of the phase diagram of quark matter has been worked out as shown in the figure to the right. It is relevant for understanding the core of neutron stars, where the only relevant thermodynamic potentials are quark chemical potential μ and temperature T.

For guidance it also shows the typical values of μ and T in heavy-ion collisions and in the early universe. For readers who are not familiar with the concept of a chemical potential, it is helpful to think of μ as a measure of the imbalance between quarks and antiquarks in the system. Higher μ means a stronger bias favoring quarks over antiquarks. At low temperatures there are no antiquarks, and then higher μ generally means a higher density of quarks.

Ordinary atomic matter as we know it is really a mixed phase, droplets of nuclear matter (nuclei) surrounded by vacuum, which exists at the low-temperature phase boundary between vacuum and nuclear matter, at μ = 310 MeV and T close to zero. If we increase the quark density (i.e. increase μ) keeping the temperature low, we move into a phase of more and more compressed nuclear matter. Following this path corresponds to burrowing more and more deeply into a neutron star.

Eventually, at an unknown critical value of μ, there is a transition to quark matter. At ultra-high densities we expect to find the color-flavor-locked (CFL) phase of color-superconducting quark matter. At intermediate densities we expect some other phases (labelled "non-CFL quark liquid" in the figure) whose nature is presently unknown. They might be other forms of color-superconducting quark matter, or something different.

Now, imagine starting at the bottom left corner of the phase diagram, in the vacuum where μ = T = 0. If we heat up the system without introducing any preference for quarks over antiquarks, this corresponds to moving vertically upwards along the T axis. At first, quarks are still confined and we create a gas of hadrons (pions, mostly). Then around T = 150 MeV there is a crossover to the quark gluon plasma: thermal fluctuations break up the pions, and we find a gas of quarks, antiquarks, and gluons, as well as lighter particles such as photons, electrons, positrons, etc. Following this path corresponds to travelling far back in time (so to say), to the state of the universe shortly after the big bang (where there was a very tiny preference for quarks over antiquarks).

The line that rises up from the nuclear/quark matter transition and then bends back towards the T axis, with its end marked by a star, is the conjectured boundary between confined and unconfined phases. Until recently it was also believed to be a boundary between phases where chiral symmetry is broken (low temperature and density) and phases where it is unbroken (high temperature and density). It is now known that the CFL phase exhibits chiral symmetry breaking, and other quark matter phases may also break chiral symmetry, so it is not clear whether this is really a chiral transition line. The line ends at the "chiral critical point", marked by a star in this figure, which is a special temperature and density at which striking physical phenomena, analogous to critical opalescence, are expected. (Reference for this section:).

For a complete description of the phase diagram it is required that one must have a complete understanding of dense, strongly interacting hadronic matter and strongly interacting quark matter from some underlying theory e.g. quantum chromodynamics (QCD). However, because such a description requires the proper understanding of QCD in its non-perturbative regime, which is still far from being completely understood, any theoretical advance remains very challenging.

== Theoretical challenges: calculation techniques ==
The phase structure of quark matter remains mostly conjectural because it is difficult to perform calculations predicting the properties of quark matter. The reason is that QCD, the theory describing the dominant interaction between quarks, is strongly coupled at the densities and temperatures of greatest physical interest, and hence it is very hard to obtain any predictions from it. Here are brief descriptions of some of the standard approaches.

=== Lattice gauge theory ===
The only first-principles calculational tool currently available is lattice QCD, i.e. brute-force computer calculations. Because of a technical obstacle known as the fermion sign problem, this method can only be used at low density and high temperature (μ < T), and it predicts that the crossover to the quark–gluon plasma will occur around T = 150 MeV However, it cannot be used to investigate the interesting color-superconducting phase structure at high density and low temperature.

=== Weak coupling theory ===
Because QCD is asymptotically free it becomes weakly coupled at unrealistically high densities, and diagrammatic methods can be used. Such methods show that the CFL phase occurs at very high density. At high temperatures, however, diagrammatic methods are still not under full control.

=== Models ===
To obtain a rough idea of what phases might occur, one can use a model that has some of the same properties as QCD, but is easier to manipulate. Many physicists use Nambu–Jona-Lasinio models, which contain no gluons, and replace the strong interaction with a four-fermion interaction. Mean-field methods are commonly used to analyse the phases. Another approach is the bag model, in which the effects of confinement are simulated by an additive energy density that penalizes unconfined quark matter.

=== Effective theories ===
Many physicists simply give up on a microscopic approach, and make informed guesses of the expected phases (perhaps based on NJL model results). For each phase, they then write down an effective theory for the low-energy excitations, in terms of a small number of parameters, and use it to make predictions that could allow those parameters to be fixed by experimental observations.

=== Other approaches ===
There are other methods that are sometimes used to shed light on QCD, but for various reasons have not yet yielded useful results in studying quark matter.

==== 1/N expansion ====
Treat the number of colors N, which is actually 3, as a large number, and expand in powers of 1/N. It turns out that at high density the higher-order corrections are large, and the expansion gives misleading results.

==== Supersymmetry ====
Adding scalar quarks (squarks) and fermionic gluons (gluinos) to the theory makes it more tractable, but the thermodynamics of quark matter depends crucially on the fact that only fermions can carry quark number, and on the number of degrees of freedom in general.

== Experimental challenges ==
Experimentally, it is hard to map the phase diagram of quark matter because it has been rather difficult to learn how to tune to high enough temperatures and density in the laboratory experiment using collisions of relativistic heavy ions as experimental tools. However, these collisions ultimately will provide information about the crossover from hadronic matter to QGP. It has been suggested that the observations of compact stars may also constrain the information about the high-density low-temperature region. Models of the cooling, spin-down, and precession of these stars offer information about the relevant properties of their interior. As observations become more precise, physicists hope to learn more.

One of the natural subjects for future research is the search for the exact location of the chiral critical point. Some ambitious lattice QCD calculations may have found evidence for it, and future calculations will clarify the situation. Heavy-ion collisions might be able to measure its position experimentally, but this will require scanning across a range of values of μ and T.

== Existence in neutron stars ==
In 2020, evidence was provided that the cores of neutron stars with mass ~2 M_{☉} were likely composed of quark matter. Their result was based on neutron-star tidal deformability during a neutron star merger as measured by gravitational-wave observatories, leading to an estimate of star radius, combined with calculations of the equation of state relating the pressure and energy density of the star's core. The evidence was strongly suggestive but did not conclusively prove the existence of quark matter.

== History ==
Several series of conferences in 2019, 2020, and 2021 were devoted to this topic.

== See also ==
- Color–flavor locking – Phenomenon in high-density strange matter
- Lattice QCD – Quantum chromodynamics on a lattice
- Quantum chromodynamics – Theory of the strong nuclear interactions
- Quark–gluon plasma – State of matter important in cosmology and particle physics
- Quark star – Compact exotic star which forms matter consisting mostly of quarks
- SU(2) color superconductivity – Property of quark matter
- Strange matter – Degenerate matter made from strange quarks
- Strangeness and quark-gluon plasma – Subatomic signature
- 1/N expansion – Perturbative analysis of quantum field theories

== Sources and further reading ==
- Aronson, S. and Ludlam, T.: "Hunting the quark gluon plasma", U.S. Dept. of Energy (2005)
- Letessier, Jean; Rafelski, Johann (February 9, 2023). Hadrons and Quark–Gluon Plasma (1 ed.). Cambridge University Press. doi:10.1017/9781009290753. ISBN 978-1-009-29075-3.
- S. Hands (2001). "The phase diagram of QCD". Contemporary Physics. 42 (4): 209–225. arXiv:physics/0105022. Bibcode:2001ConPh..42..209H. doi:10.1080/00107510110063843. S2CID 16835076.
- K. Rajagopal (2001). "Free the quarks" (PDF). Beam Line. 32 (2): 9–15.
