= Strangelet =

Type of hypothetical particle

A strangelet (pronounced /ˈstreɪndʒ.lɪt/) is a hypothetical particle consisting of a bound state of roughly equal numbers of up, down, and strange quarks. An equivalent description is that a strangelet is a small fragment of strange matter, small enough to be considered a particle. The size of an object composed of strange matter could, theoretically, range from a few femtometers across (with the mass of a light nucleus) to arbitrarily large. Once the size becomes macroscopic (on the order of meters across), such an object is usually called a strange star. The term "strangelet" originates with Edward Farhi and Robert Jaffe in 1984. It has been theorized that strangelets can convert matter to strange matter on contact. Strangelets have also been suggested as a dark matter candidate.

== Theoretical possibility ==
=== Strange matter hypothesis ===
The known particles with strange quarks are unstable. Because the strange quark is heavier than the up and down quarks, it can spontaneously decay, via the weak interaction, into an up quark, an electron, and an antineutrino. Consequently, particles containing strange quarks, such as the lambda particle, always lose their strangeness, by decaying into lighter particles containing only up and down quarks.

However, condensed states with a larger number of quarks might not suffer from this instability. The possibility that some sufficiently dense clump of nuclear matter containing some strange quarks might be stable against decay is the strange matter hypothesis, proposed separately by Arnold Bodmer in 1971 and by Edward Witten in 1984. According to this hypothesis, when a large enough number of quarks are concentrated together, the lowest energy state is one which has roughly equal numbers of up, down, and strange quarks, namely a strangelet. This stability would occur because of the Pauli exclusion principle; having three types of quarks, rather than two as in normal nuclear matter, allows more quarks to be placed in lower energy levels, hence confined in a smaller space at the same pressure.

=== Relationship with nuclei ===
A nucleon is a nuclear particle (in some nuclei a fairly large number of them) each composed of a number of up and down quarks, confined into triplets (neutrons and protons). According to the strange matter hypothesis, strangelets are more stable than nuclei, so nuclei are expected to decay into strangelets. But this process may be extremely slow because there is a large energy barrier to overcome: as the weak interaction starts making a nucleus into a strangelet, the first few strange quarks form strange baryons, such as the Lambda, which are heavy. Only if many conversions occur almost simultaneously will the number of strange quarks reach the critical proportion required to achieve a lower energy state. This is very unlikely to happen, so even if the strange matter hypothesis were correct, nuclei would never be seen to decay to strangelets because their lifetime would be longer than the age of the universe.

=== Size ===
The stability of smaller strangelets (as opposed to strange stars) depends on their size, because of surface tension or charge screening.

- Strange matter's natural surface tension at the interface between quark matter and vacuum affects small strangelets more than big ones, but the actual surface tension natural to strange matter is unknown. If it is smaller than a critical value of a few MeV per square femtometer then larger-sized strangelets are unstable and will tend to fission into smaller strangelets; however strange stars would still be stabilized by gravity holding them together, and if fractured, compressing the parts back together. If the surface tension natural to strange matter is larger than the (unknown) critical value, then strangelets become more stable as they get larger / heavier.
- The effects of charge screening allows small strangelets to be charged, with a neutralizing cloud of electrons / positrons around them, but still requires larger strangelets – like any large piece of any kind of matter – to be electrically neutral in their interiors. The charge screening distance tends to be of the order of a few femtometers, so only the outer few femtometers of a strangelet can carry a charge.

== Natural or artificial occurrence ==
Although nuclei do not decay to strangelets, there are other ways to create strangelets, so if the strange matter hypothesis is correct there should be strangelets in the universe. There are at least three ways they might be created in nature:

Cosmological strangelets
In the very early universe, when the QCD confinement phase transition occurred, it is possible that strangelets were created along with the neutrons and protons that form ordinary matter.
High-energy processes
The universe is full of very high-energy particles (cosmic rays). It is possible that when these collide with each other or with neutron stars they may provide enough energy to overcome the energy barrier and create strangelets from nuclear matter. Some identified exotic cosmic ray events, such as "Price's event" – i.e., those with very low charge-to-mass ratios (as the s-quark itself possesses charge commensurate with the more-familiar d-quark, but is much more massive) – could have already registered strangelets.
Cosmic ray impacts
In addition to head-on collisions of cosmic rays, ultra high energy cosmic rays impacting on Earth's atmosphere may create strangelets.

These scenarios offer possibilities for observing strangelets. If strangelets can be produced in high-energy collisions, then they might be produced by heavy-ion colliders. Similarly, if there are strangelets flying around the universe, then occasionally a strangelet should hit Earth, where it may appear as an exotic type of cosmic ray; alternatively, a stable strangelet could end up incorporated into the bulk of the Earth's matter, acquiring an electron shell proportional to its charge and hence appearing as an anomalously heavy isotope of the appropriate element – though searches for such anomalous "isotopes" have, so far, been unsuccessful.

=== Accelerator production ===
At heavy ion accelerators like the Relativistic Heavy Ion Collider (RHIC), nuclei are collided at relativistic speeds, creating strange and antistrange quarks that could conceivably lead to strangelet production. The experimental signature of a strangelet would be its very high ratio of mass to charge, which would cause its trajectory in a magnetic field to be very nearly, but not quite, straight. The STAR collaboration has searched for strangelets produced at the RHIC, but none were found. The Large Hadron Collider (LHC) is even less likely to produce strangelets, but searches are planned for the LHC ALICE detector.

=== Space-based detection ===
The Alpha Magnetic Spectrometer (AMS), an instrument that is mounted on the International Space Station, could detect strangelets.

=== Possible seismic detection ===
In May 2002, a group of researchers at Southern Methodist University reported the possibility that strangelets may have been responsible for seismic events recorded on 22 October and 24 November 1993. The authors later retracted their claim, after finding that the clock of one of the seismic stations had a large error during the relevant period.

It has been suggested that the International Monitoring System be set up to verify the Comprehensive Nuclear Test Ban Treaty (CTBT) after entry into force may be useful as a sort of "strangelet observatory" using the entire Earth as its detector. The IMS will be designed to detect anomalous seismic disturbances down to 1 kiloton of TNT (4.2 TJ) energy release or less, and could be able to track strangelets passing through Earth in real time if properly exploited.

=== Impacts on Solar System bodies ===
It has been suggested that strangelets of subplanetary (i.e. heavy meteorite) mass would puncture planets and other Solar System objects, leading to impact craters which show characteristic features.

== Potential propagation ==
If the strange matter hypothesis is correct, and if a stable negatively-charged strangelet with a surface tension larger than the aforementioned critical value exists, then a larger strangelet would be more stable than a smaller one. One speculation that has resulted from the idea is that a strangelet coming into contact with a lump of ordinary matter could over time convert the ordinary matter to strange matter.

This is not a concern for strangelets in cosmic rays because they are produced far from Earth and have had time to decay to their ground state, which is predicted by most models to be positively charged, so they are electrostatically repelled by nuclei, and would rarely merge with them. On the other hand, high-energy collisions could produce negatively charged strangelet states, which could live long enough to interact with the nuclei of ordinary matter.

The danger of catalyzed conversion by strangelets produced in heavy-ion colliders has received some media attention, and concerns of this type were raised at the commencement of the RHIC experiment at Brookhaven, which could potentially have created strangelets. A detailed analysis concluded that the RHIC collisions were comparable to ones which naturally occur as cosmic rays traverse the Solar System, and thus such a disaster would have already occurred were it possible. RHIC has been operating since 2000 without incident. Similar concerns have been raised about the operation of the LHC at CERN but such fears are dismissed as far-fetched by scientists.

In the case of a neutron star, the conversion scenario may be more plausible. A neutron star is in a sense a giant nucleus (20 km across), held together by gravity, but it is electrically neutral and would not electrostatically repel strangelets. If a strangelet hit a neutron star, it might catalyze quarks near its surface to form into more strange matter, potentially continuing until the entire star became a strange star.

== Debate about the strange matter hypothesis ==
The strange matter hypothesis remains unproven. No direct search for strangelets in cosmic rays or particle accelerators has yet confirmed a strangelet. If any of the objects such as neutron stars could be shown to have a surface made of strange matter, this would indicate that strange matter is stable at zero pressure, which would vindicate the strange matter hypothesis. However, there is no strong evidence for strange matter surfaces on neutron stars.

Another argument against the hypothesis is that if it were true, essentially all neutron stars should be made of strange matter, and otherwise none should be. Even if there were only a few strange stars initially, violent events such as collisions would soon create many fragments of strange matter flying around the universe. Because collision with a single strangelet would convert a neutron star to strange matter, all but a few of the most recently formed neutron stars should by now have already been converted to strange matter.

This argument is still debated, but if it is correct then showing that one old neutron star has a conventional nuclear matter crust would disprove the strange matter hypothesis.

Because of its importance for the strange matter hypothesis, there is an ongoing effort to determine whether the surfaces of neutron stars are made of strange matter or nuclear matter. The evidence currently favors nuclear matter. This comes from the phenomenology of X-ray bursts, which is well explained in terms of a nuclear matter crust, and from measurement of seismic vibrations in magnetars.

== In fiction ==
- One episode of the TV series Odyssey 5 featured an attempt to destroy the planet by intentionally creating negatively charged strangelets in a particle accelerator.
- The BBC docudrama End Day features a scenario where a particle accelerator in New York City explodes. This creates a strangelet which creates a chain reaction which destroys Earth.
- The Robert L. Forward story "A Matter Most Strange" included ins collection Indistinguishable from Magic deals with the making of a strangelet in a particle accelerator.
- In Douglas Preston's 2010 novel Impact, an alien machine creates strangelets. The machine's strangelets impact the Earth and Moon and pass through them.
- Steve Alten's 2011 novel Phobos, written as the third and final part of his Domain trilogy, presents a fictional story where strangelets are unintentionally created at the LHC and escape from it to destroy the Earth.
- In Donald E. Westlake's 1992 black-comedy novel Humans, an irritated God sends an angel to Earth to bring about Armageddon by means of using a strangelet created in a particle accelerator to convert the Earth into a quark star.
- In the 2010 film Quantum Apocalypse, a strangelet approaches the Earth from space.
- In Hannu Rajaniemi's novel The Quantum Thief (and the rest of the author's Jean le Flambeur trilogy) strangelets are mostly used as weapons, but during an early project to terraform Mars, one was used to convert Phobos into an auxiliary "sun".

== See also ==
- Grey goo
- Ice-nine
- Hyperon, a baryon with at least one strange quark
