= Degenerate matter =

Type of dense exotic matter in physics

Degenerate matter occurs when the Pauli exclusion principle significantly alters a state of matter at low temperature. The term is used in astrophysics to refer to dense stellar objects such as white dwarfs and neutron stars, where thermal pressure alone is not enough to prevent gravitational collapse. The term also applies to metals in the Fermi gas approximation.

Degenerate matter is usually modelled as an ideal Fermi gas, an ensemble of non-interacting fermions. In a quantum mechanical description, particles limited to a finite volume may take only a discrete set of energies, called quantum states. The Pauli exclusion principle prevents identical fermions from occupying the same quantum state. At lowest total energy (when the thermal energy of the particles is negligible), all the lowest energy quantum states are filled. This state is referred to as full degeneracy. This degeneracy pressure remains non-zero even at absolute zero temperature. Adding particles or reducing the volume forces the particles into higher-energy quantum states. In this situation, a compression force is required, and is made manifest as a resisting pressure. The key feature is that this degeneracy pressure does not depend on the temperature but only on the density of the fermions. Degeneracy pressure keeps dense stars in equilibrium, independent of the thermal structure of the star.

A degenerate mass whose fermions have speeds close to the speed of light (particle kinetic energy larger than its rest mass energy) is called relativistic degenerate matter. The concept of degenerate stars, stellar objects composed of degenerate matter, was originally developed in a joint effort between Arthur Eddington, Ralph Fowler and Arthur Milne.

== Concept ==
Quantum mechanics uses the word 'degenerate' in two ways: degenerate energy levels and as the low temperature ground state limit for states of matter. The electron degeneracy pressure occurs in the ground state systems which are non-degenerate in energy levels. The term "degeneracy" derives from work on the specific heat of gases that pre-dates the use of the term in quantum mechanics.

Degenerate matter exhibits quantum mechanical properties when a fermion system temperature approaches absolute zero. These properties result from a combination of the Pauli exclusion principle and quantum confinement. The Pauli principle allows only one fermion in each quantum state and the confinement ensures that energy of these states increases as they are filled. The lowest states fill up and fermions are forced to occupy high energy states even at low temperature.

While the Pauli principle and Fermi-Dirac distribution applies to all matter, the interesting cases for degenerate matter involve systems of many fermions. These cases can be understood with the help of the Fermi gas model. Examples include electrons in metals and in white dwarf stars and neutrons in neutron stars. The electrons are confined by Coulomb attraction to positive ion cores; the neutrons are confined by gravitation attraction. The fermions, forced in to higher levels by the Pauli principle, exert pressure preventing further compression.

The allocation or distribution of fermions into quantum states ranked by energy is called the Fermi-Dirac distribution. Degenerate matter exhibits the results of Fermi-Dirac distribution.

== Degeneracy pressure ==
For a classical ideal gas, pressure is proportional to its temperature according to the ideal gas law
$$P=k_{\rm B}\frac{NT}{V},$$
where P is pressure, k_{B} is the Boltzmann constant, N is the number of particles (typically atoms or molecules), T is temperature, and V is the volume. In contrast, the pressure exerted by degenerate matter depends only weakly on its temperature. In particular, the pressure remains nonzero even at absolute zero temperature. At relatively low densities, the pressure of a fully degenerate gas can be derived by treating the system as an ideal Fermi gas, in this way
$$P=\frac{(3\pi^2)^{2/3}\hbar^2}{5m} \left(\frac{N}{V}\right)^{5/3},$$
where m is the mass of the individual particles making up the gas. At very high densities, where most of the particles are forced into quantum states with relativistic energies, the pressure is given by
$$P=K\left(\frac{N}{V}\right)^{4/3},$$
where K is another proportionality constant depending on the properties of the particles making up the gas.

Pressure vs temperature curves of a classical ideal gas and quantum ideal gases (Fermi gas, Bose gas), for a given particle density.

All matter experiences both normal thermal pressure and degeneracy pressure, but in commonly encountered gases, thermal pressure dominates so much that degeneracy pressure can be ignored. Likewise, degenerate matter still has normal thermal pressure; the degeneracy pressure dominates to the point that temperature has a negligible effect on the total pressure. The adjacent figure shows the thermal pressure (red line) and total pressure (blue line) in a Fermi gas, with the difference between the two being the degeneracy pressure. As the temperature falls, the density and the degeneracy pressure increase, until the degeneracy pressure contributes most of the total pressure.

While degeneracy pressure usually dominates at extremely high densities, it is the ratio between degenerate pressure and thermal pressure which determines degeneracy. Given a sufficiently drastic increase in temperature (such as during a red giant star's helium flash), matter can become non-degenerate without reducing its density. This is because enough thermal energy becomes available to excite particles to higher energy levels.

Degeneracy pressure contributes to the pressure of conventional solids, but these are not usually considered to be degenerate matter because a significant contribution to their pressure is provided by electrical repulsion of atomic nuclei and the screening of nuclei from each other by electrons. The free electron model of metals derives their physical properties by considering the conduction electrons alone as a degenerate gas, while the majority of the electrons are regarded as occupying bound quantum states. This solid state contrasts with degenerate matter that forms the body of a white dwarf, where most of the electrons would be treated as occupying free particle momentum states.

Exotic examples of degenerate matter include neutron degenerate matter, strange matter, metallic hydrogen and white dwarf matter.

== Degenerate gases ==
Degenerate gases are gases composed of fermions such as electrons, protons, and neutrons rather than molecules of ordinary matter. The electron gas in ordinary metals and in the interior of white dwarfs are two examples. Following the Pauli exclusion principle, there can be only one fermion occupying each quantum state. In a degenerate gas, all quantum states are filled up to the Fermi energy. Most stars are supported against their own gravitation by normal thermal gas pressure, while in white dwarf stars the supporting force comes from the degeneracy pressure of the electron gas in their interior. In neutron stars, the degenerate particles are neutrons.

A fermion gas in which all quantum states below a given energy level are filled is called a fully degenerate fermion gas. The difference between this energy level and the lowest energy level is known as the Fermi energy.

=== Electron degeneracy ===
In an ordinary fermion gas in which thermal effects dominate, most of the available electron energy levels are unfilled and the electrons are free to move to these states. As particle density is increased, electrons progressively fill the lower energy states and additional electrons are forced to occupy states of higher energy even at low temperatures. Degenerate gases strongly resist further compression because the electrons cannot move to already filled lower energy levels due to the Pauli exclusion principle. Since electrons cannot give up energy by moving to lower energy states, no thermal energy can be extracted. The momentum of the fermions in the fermion gas nevertheless generates pressure, termed "degeneracy pressure".

Under high densities, matter becomes a degenerate gas when all electrons are stripped from their parent atoms. The core of a star, once hydrogen burning nuclear fusion reactions stops, becomes a collection of positively charged ions, largely helium and carbon nuclei, floating in a sea of electrons, which have been stripped from the nuclei. Degenerate gas is an almost perfect conductor of heat and does not obey ordinary gas laws. White dwarfs are luminous not because they are generating energy but rather because they have trapped a large amount of heat which is gradually radiated away. Normal gas exerts higher pressure when it is heated and expands, but the pressure in a degenerate gas does not depend on the temperature. When gas becomes super-compressed, particles position right up against each other to produce degenerate gas that behaves more like a solid. In degenerate gases the kinetic energies of electrons are quite high and the rate of collision between electrons and other particles is quite low, therefore degenerate electrons can travel great distances at speeds that approach the speed of light. Instead of temperature, the pressure in a degenerate gas depends only on the speed of the degenerate particles; however, adding heat does not increase the speed of most of the electrons, because they are stuck in fully occupied quantum states. Pressure is increased only by the mass of the particles, which increases the gravitational force pulling the particles closer together. Therefore, the phenomenon is the opposite of that normally found in matter where if the mass of the matter is increased, the object becomes bigger. In degenerate gas, when the mass is increased, the particles become spaced closer together due to gravity (and the pressure is increased), so the object becomes smaller. Degenerate gas can be compressed to very high densities, typical values being in the range of 10,000 kilograms per cubic centimeter.

There is an upper limit to the mass of an electron-degenerate object, the Chandrasekhar limit, beyond which electron degeneracy pressure cannot support the object against collapse. The limit is approximately 1.44 solar masses for objects with typical compositions expected for white dwarf stars (carbon and oxygen with two baryons per electron). This mass cut-off is appropriate only for a star supported by ideal electron degeneracy pressure under Newtonian gravity; in general relativity and with realistic Coulomb corrections, the corresponding mass limit is around 1.38 solar masses. The limit may also change with the chemical composition of the object, as it affects the ratio of mass to number of electrons present. The object's rotation, which counteracts the gravitational force, also changes the limit for any particular object. Celestial objects below this limit are white dwarf stars, formed by the gradual shrinking of the cores of stars that run out of fuel. During this shrinking, an electron-degenerate gas forms in the core, providing sufficient degeneracy pressure as it is compressed to resist further collapse. Above this mass limit, a neutron star (primarily supported by neutron degeneracy pressure) or a black hole may be formed instead.

=== Neutron degeneracy ===
Neutron degeneracy is analogous to electron degeneracy and exists in neutron stars, which are partially supported by the pressure from a degenerate neutron gas. Neutron stars are formed either directly from the supernovae of stars with masses between 10 and 25 M_{☉} (solar masses), or by white dwarfs acquiring a mass in excess of the Chandrasekhar limit of 1.44 M_{☉}, usually either as a result of a merger or by feeding off of a close binary partner. Above the Chandrasekhar limit, the gravitational pressure at the core exceeds the electron degeneracy pressure, and electrons begin to combine with protons to produce neutrons (via inverse beta decay, also termed electron capture). The result is an extremely compact star composed of "nuclear matter", which is predominantly a degenerate neutron gas with a small admixture of degenerate proton and electron gases.

Neutrons in a degenerate neutron gas are spaced much more closely than electrons in an electron-degenerate gas because the more massive neutron has a much shorter wavelength at a given energy. This phenomenon is compounded by the fact that the pressures within neutron stars are much higher than those in white dwarfs. The pressure increase is caused by the fact that the compactness of a neutron star causes gravitational forces to be much higher than in a less compact body with similar mass. The result is a star with a diameter on the order of a thousandth that of a white dwarf.

The properties of neutron matter set an upper limit to the mass of a neutron star, the Tolman–Oppenheimer–Volkoff limit, which is analogous to the Chandrasekhar limit for white dwarf stars.

=== Quark degeneracy ===
At densities greater than those supported by neutron degeneracy, quark-degenerate matter may occur in the cores of neutron stars, depending on the equations of state of neutron-degenerate matter. There is no observational evidence to support this conjecture and theoretical models that predict de-confined quark matter are only valid at masses higher than any observed neutron star.

== History ==
In 1914 Walther Nernst described the reduction of the specific heat of gases at very low temperature as "degeneration"; he attributed this to quantum effects. In subsequent work in various papers on quantum thermodynamics by Albert Einstein, by Max Planck, and by Erwin Schrödinger, the effect at low temperatures came to be called "gas degeneracy". A fully degenerate gas has no volume dependence on pressure when temperature approaches absolute zero.

Early in 1927 Enrico Fermi and separately Llewellyn Thomas developed a semi-classical model for electrons in a metal. The model treated the electrons as a gas. Later in 1927, Arnold Sommerfeld applied the Pauli principle via Fermi-Dirac statistics to this electron gas model, computing the specific heat of metals; the result became Fermi gas model for metals. Sommerfeld called the low temperature region with quantum effects a "wholly degenerate gas".

The concept of degenerate stars, stellar objects composed of degenerate matter, was originally developed in a joint effort between Arthur Eddington, Ralph Fowler and Arthur Milne. Eddington had suggested that the atoms in Sirius B were almost completely ionised and closely packed. Fowler described white dwarfs as composed of a gas of particles that became degenerate at low temperature; he also pointed out that ordinary atoms are broadly similar in regards to the filling of energy levels by fermions. In 1926, Milne proposed that degenerate matter is found in the cores of ordinary stars, not only in compact stars. In 1927 Ralph H. Fowler applied Fermi's model to the puzzle of the stability of white dwarf stars. This approach was extended to relativistic models by later studies and with the work of Subrahmanyan Chandrasekhar became the accepted model for star stability.

== See also ==
- Bose–Einstein condensate – Degenerate bosonic gas
- Fermi liquid theory – Theoretical model in physics
- Metallic hydrogen – High-pressure phase of hydrogen
