= SU(2) color superconductivity =

Property of quark matter

Several hundred metals, compounds, alloys and ceramics possess the property of superconductivity at low temperatures. The SU(2) color quark matter adjoins the list of superconducting systems. Although it is a mathematical abstraction, its properties are believed to be closely related to the SU(3) color quark matter, which exists in nature when ordinary matter is compressed at supranuclear densities above ~ 0.5×10^{39} nucleon/cm^{3}.

== Superconductors in lab ==
Superconducting materials are characterized by the loss of resistance and two parameters: a critical temperature T_{c} and a critical magnetic field that brings the superconductor to its normal state. In 1911, H. Kamerlingh Onnes discovered the superconductivity of mercury at a temperature below 4 K. Later, other substances with superconductivity at temperatures up to 30 K were found. Superconductors prevent the penetration of the external magnetic field into the sample when the magnetic field strength is less than the critical value. This effect was called the Meissner effect. High-temperature superconductivity was discovered in the 1980s. Of the known compounds, the highest critical temperature T_{с}=135 K belongs to HgBa_{2}Ca_{2}Cu_{3}O_{8+x}.

Low-temperature superconductivity has found a theoretical explanation in the model of John Bardeen, Leon Cooper, and John Robert Schrieffer (BCS theory). The physical basis of the model is the phenomenon of Cooper pairing of electrons. Since a pair of electrons carries an integer spin, the correlated states of the electrons can form a Bose–Einstein condensate. An equivalent formalism was developed by Nikolay Bogoliubov and John George Valatin.

Cooper pairing of nucleons takes place in ordinary nuclei. The effect manifests itself in the Bethe–Weizsacker mass formula, the last pairing term of which describes the correlation energy of two nucleons. Because of the pairing, the binding energy of even–even nuclei systematically exceeds the binding energy of odd–even and odd–odd nuclei.

== Superfluidity in neutron stars ==
The superfluid phase of neutron matter exists in neutron stars. The superfluidity is described by the BCS model with a realistic nucleon-nucleon interaction potential. By increasing the density of nuclear matter above the saturation density, quark matter is formed. It is expected that dense quark matter at low temperatures is a color superconductor. In the case of the SU(3) color group, a Bose–Einstein condensate of the quark Cooper pairs carries an open color. To meet the requirement of confinement, a Bose–Einstein condensate of colorless 6-quark states is considered, or the projected BCS theory is used.

== Superconductivity with dense two-color QCD ==
The BCS formalism is applicable without modifications to the description of quark matter with color group SU(2), where Cooper pairs are colorless. The Nambu–Jona-Lasinio model predicts the existence of the superconducting phase of SU(2) color quark matter at high densities. This physical picture is confirmed in the Polyakov–Nambu–Jona-Lasinio model, and also in lattice QCD models, in which the properties of cold quark matter can be described based on the first principles of quantum chromodynamics. The possibility of modeling on the lattices of two-color QCD at finite chemical potentials for even numbers of the quark flavors is associated with the positive-definiteness of the integral measure and the absence of a sign problem.

== See also ==
- QCD matter
- Quark star
