= Nuclear matter =

System of interacting nucleons

Phases of nuclear matter with equal numbers of neutrons and protons; Compare with Siemens & Jensen.

Nuclear matter is an idealized system of interacting nucleons (protons and neutrons) that exists in several phases of exotic matter that, as of yet, are not fully established. It is not matter in an atomic nucleus, but a hypothetical substance consisting of a huge number of protons and neutrons held together by only nuclear forces and no Coulomb forces. Volume and the number of particles are infinite, but the ratio is finite. Infinite volume implies no surface effects and translational invariance (only differences in position matter, not absolute positions).

A common idealization is symmetric nuclear matter, which consists of equal numbers of protons and neutrons, with no electrons.

When nuclear matter is compressed to sufficiently high density, it is expected, on the basis of the asymptotic freedom of quantum chromodynamics, that it will become quark matter, which is a degenerate Fermi gas of quarks.

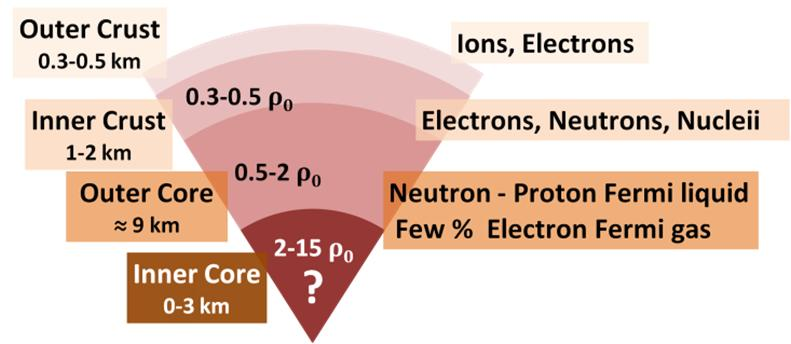
Cross-section of neutron star. Densities are in terms of ρ_{0} the saturation nuclear matter density, where nucleons begin to touch. Patterned after Haensel et al., page 12

Some authors use "nuclear matter" in a broader sense, and refer to the model described above as "infinite nuclear matter", and consider it as a "toy model", a testing ground for analytical techniques. However, the composition of a neutron star, which requires more than neutrons and protons, is not necessarily locally charge neutral, and does not exhibit translation invariance, often is differently referred to, for example, as neutron star matter or stellar matter and is considered distinct from nuclear matter. In a neutron star, pressure rises from zero (at the surface) to an unknown large value in the center.

Methods capable of treating finite regions have been applied to stars and to atomic nuclei. One such model for finite nuclei is the liquid drop model, which includes surface effects and Coulomb interactions.

== See also ==
- QCD vacuum – Lowest energy state in quantum chromodynamics
- Quark–gluon plasma – State of matter important in cosmology and particle physics
- Degenerate matter – Type of dense exotic matter in physics
- Neutron-degenerate matter – Type of dense exotic matter in physics
- Strange matter – Degenerate matter made from strange quarks
- Nuclear structure – Structure of the atomic nucleus
- Neutronium – Hypothetical substance in nuclear physics
- Nuclear physics – Field of physics that studies atomic interactions
- Nuclear spectroscopy – Using nucleus properties to probe material properties
