= Strange matter =

Degenerate matter made from strange quarks

Strange matter (or strange quark matter) is quark matter containing strange quarks. In extreme environments, strange matter is hypothesized to occur in the core of neutron stars, or, more speculatively, as isolated droplets that may vary in size from femtometers (strangelets) to kilometers, as in the hypothetical strange stars. At high enough density, strange matter is expected to be color superconducting.

Ordinary matter, also referred to as atomic matter, is composed of atoms, with nearly all matter concentrated in the atomic nuclei. Nuclear matter is a liquid composed of neutrons and protons, and they are themselves composed of up and down quarks. Quark matter is a condensed form of matter composed entirely of quarks. When quark matter does not contain strange quarks, it is sometimes referred to as non-strange quark matter.

== Context ==
In particle physics and astrophysics, the term "strange matter" is used in two different contexts, one broader and the other more specific and hypothetical:

1. In the broader context, our current understanding of the laws of nature predicts that strange matter could be created when nuclear matter (made of protons and neutrons) is compressed beyond a critical density. At this critical pressure and density, the protons and neutrons dissociate into quarks, yielding quark matter and potentially strange matter.
2. A more specific hypothesis is that strange quark matter is the true ground state of all matter, and thus more stable than ordinary nuclear matter. This idea is known as the "strange matter hypothesis", or the Bodmer–Witten assumption. Under this hypothesis, the nuclei of the atoms we see around us are only metastable, even when the external critical pressure is zero, and given enough time (or the right stimulus) the nuclei would decay into stable droplets of strange matter. Droplets of strange matter are also referred to as strangelets.

== Stability of strange matter only at high pressure ==
In the general context, strange matter might occur inside neutron stars, if the pressure at their core is high enough to provide a sufficient gravitational force (i.e. above the critical pressure). At the sort of densities and high pressures we expect in the center of a neutron star, the quark matter would probably be strange matter. It could conceivably be non-strange quark matter, if the effective mass of the strange quark were too high. Charm quarks and heavier quarks would only occur at much higher densities.

Strange matter comes about as a way to relieve degeneracy pressure. The Pauli exclusion principle forbids fermions such as quarks from occupying the same position and energy level. When the particle density is high enough that all energy levels below the available thermal energy are already occupied, increasing the density further requires raising some to higher, unoccupied energy levels. This need for energy to cause compression manifests as a pressure. Neutrons consist of twice as many down quarks (charge −1/3 e) as up quarks (charge +2/3 e), so the degeneracy pressure of down quarks usually dominates electrically neutral quark matter. However, when the required energy level is high enough, an alternative becomes available: half of the down quarks can be transmuted to strange quarks (charge −1/3 e). The higher rest mass of the strange quark costs some energy, but by opening up an additional set of energy levels, the average energy per particle can be lower, making strange matter more stable at such high pressures than non-strange quark matter.

A neutron star with a quark matter core is often called a hybrid star. However, it is difficult to know whether hybrid stars really exist in nature because physicists currently have little idea of the likely value of the critical pressure or density. It seems plausible that the transition to quark matter will already have occurred when the separation between the nucleons becomes much smaller than their size, so the critical density must be less than about 100 times nuclear saturation density. But a more precise estimate is not yet available, because the strong interaction that governs the behavior of quarks is mathematically intractable, and numerical calculations using lattice QCD are currently blocked by the fermion sign problem.

One major area of activity in neutron star physics is the attempt to find observable signatures by which we could tell whether neutron stars have quark matter (probably strange matter) in their core.

During the merger of two neutron stars, strange matter may be ejected out into the space around the stars, which may allow for the studying of strange matter. However, the rate at which strange matter decays is unknown, and there are very few binary pairs of neutron stars nearby to the Solar System, which could make the official discovery of strange matter very difficult.

== Stability of strange matter at zero pressure ==
If the "strange matter hypothesis" is true, then nuclear matter is metastable against decaying into strange matter. The lifetime for spontaneous decay is very long, so we do not see this decay process happening around us. However, under this hypothesis there should be strange matter in the universe:

1. Quark stars (often called "strange stars") consist of quark matter from their core to their surface. They would be several kilometers across, and may have a very thin crust of nuclear matter.
2. Strangelets are small pieces of strange matter, perhaps as small as nuclei. They would be produced when strange stars are formed or collide, or when a nucleus decays.

== See also ==
- Exotic matter – Physics term for multiple concepts
- Quark star – Compact exotic star which forms matter consisting mostly of quarks
- Strangeness and quark–gluon plasma – subatomic signature
- Strangelet – Type of hypothetical particle
- Quark – Elementary particle, fundamental constituent of matter
- QCD matter – Hypothetical phases of matter
