= Hypothetical star =

Star types predicted by theory

A hypothetical star is a star, or type of star, that is speculated to exist but has yet to be definitively observed. Hypothetical types of stars have been conjectured to exist, have existed, or will exist in the future universe.

== Types ==
Scientifically speculated hypothetical types include:

Type	Description	Candidates	Notes	Citations
Anti-star	A star composed of antimatter.		Anti-helium nuclei have been detected.	
Blitzar	Pulsar with enough mass to suddenly collapse into a black hole when the rotation speed slows.			
Blue dwarf	Conjectured to develop after a red dwarf has exhausted most of its hydrogen.	—N/a	The visible universe is not old enough for this form to come into existence.	
Black dwarf	The final state for a star, like the Sun, that is too small to become a black hole or a neutron star. It would take a star like the Sun roughly a quadrillion (10^{15}) years to reach this state, so none are believed to exist today.	—N/a	The universe is not old enough for this form to come into existence.	
Black star	A star predicted in semiclassical gravity which collapses into a black hole state but has neither a gravitational singularity nor an event horizon.	none		
Boson star	A star or astronomical object made of bosons, such as photons or gluons, rather than conventional matter.	none		
Buchdahl star	A stellar object at the upper bound on compactness.	none		
Dark energy star	A conjectured alternative to a black hole.	none		
Dark matter star	Conjectured to have existed early in the universe.	JADES-GS-z13-0, JADES-GS-z12-0, and JADES-GS-z11-0		
Dark star	A theoretical construct based on Newtonian gravitation, of a star with gravity so strong that even light cannot escape.	—N/a	This form cannot exist, as Newtonian gravitation breaks down under these conditions. It is a disproved hypothesis.	
Electroweak star	A star where gravitational collapse is prevented by radiation pressure resulting from electroweak burning. In this type of star, quarks are converted to leptons via the electroweak interaction. The core of the star would be hand-sized, containing perhaps two Earth masses, and might follow from the collapse of a quark star.	none		
Frozen star	A very-low-mass star with a surface temperature of perhaps 300 kelvins that could form in the far future, when the metallicity of the interstellar medium is higher than the current value.	—N/a	The universe is not old enough for this form to come into existence.	
Fuzzball	A formulation of black holes in string theory.	none		
Gravastar	An alternative to a black hole that denies the possibility of a singularity.	none		
Hawking star	A star that contains a microscopic primordial black hole (PBH) in its core	none		
Hyperon star	A massive neutron star containing hyperons.	PSR J0348+0432		
Iron star	A final state for a star in the far future (10^{1500} years) of the universe, when all matter is transmuted to iron via quantum tunneling.	—N/a	The universe is not old enough for this form to come into existence.	
MECO	Magnetospheric eternally collapsing object: a hypothetical alternative to black holes.	Q0957+561		
Planck star	A star where the energy density is around the Planck density. The star will start to expand as soon as its density reaches the Planck constant. To the black hole, it expands instantly, but to the outside world, it takes eons to expand even the slightest.	none		
Population III star	The very earliest stars, virtually free of metals, believed to have existed in the early universe when the only common elements were primordial hydrogen and helium.	none		
Preon star	A star with a core composed of preons.	none		
Q star (grey hole)	A compact, heavy neutron star with an exotic state of matter where most light does not escape the star.	Cygnus X-1		
Quark star	Star composed of quark matter or strange matter.	3C 58, PSR B0943+10, XTE J1739-285		
Quasi-star	A conjectured star from the early universe with a black hole at its center.	The Cliff, MoM-BH*-1		
Strange star	A form of quark star, a neutron star with strange matter at its core, or star which is a ball of strange matter.	none		
Thorne–Żytkow object	A hybrid red giant, red supergiant, or Wolf–Rayet star whose core is a neutron star.	HV 11417		
White hole	The polar opposite of a black hole, it ejects matter from its core into space. It is hypothetically formed when a region around a black hole experiences a loss in entropy, and will immediately collapse when the entropy is restored. The loss of entropy allows the black hole to travel back in time, so it will continue to suck matter up into its event horizon, but once one goes into the event horizon of a white hole, space-time is so distorted that it will always lead one to outside the event horizon, even if one tries to go to the singularity.	GRB 060614		

== Specific stars ==
Specific hypothetical stars include:

Star	Description	Notes	Citations
Nemesis	A star proposed as a companion to the Sun by Richard A. Muller in 1984	This star was ruled out by all-sky surveys.	
Coatlicue	A star thought to be the reason for how the Sun (and many other stars) came to be, proposed by Matthieu Gounelle and Georges Meynet in 2012		
3 Cassiopeiae	A star recorded by astronomer John Flamsteed, but never seen again		
34 Tauri	A star recorded by John Flamsteed, later revealed to have been the planet Uranus		

== See also ==
- Hypothetical astronomical object
