= Usha Kulshreshtha =

Indian theoretical physicist

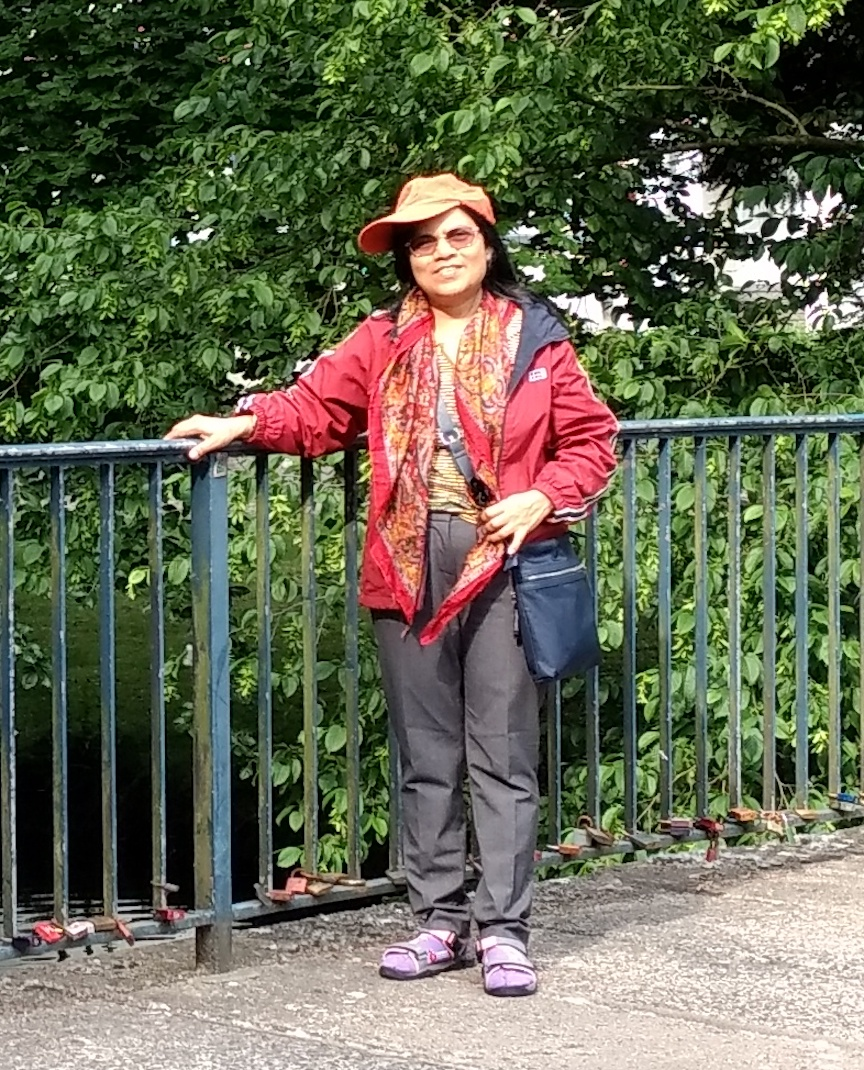
- Usha Kulshreshtha at the University of Oldenburg in June 2017
- Born: 1 July 1964 (age 62); Gwalior, India
- Education: University of Kaiserslautern; Jiwaji University
- Known for: Quantum field theory, Light-front quantization, General relativity, Boson stars
- Scientific career
- Fields: Theoretical Physics
- Doctoral advisor: Harald J. W. Mueller-Kirsten (Germany)

Usha Kulshreshtha (born July, 1964) is an Indian theoretical physicist, specializing in the Dirac's instant-form and light-front quantization of quantum field theory models, string theory models and D-brane actions using the Hamiltonian, path integral and BRST quantization methods, constrained dynamics, construction of gauge theories and their quantization under gauge-fixing as well as study of boson stars, and wormholes in general relativity and gravity theory.

== Education and career ==
Kulshreshtha obtained her B.Sc. (1983) and M.Sc. (1985) degrees from Jiwaji University, Gwalior. She received her Ph.D. (Dr. rer. nat.) in 1993 from the University of Kaiserslautern, Germany, under the supervision of Harald J. W. Mueller-Kirsten. She held a five-year position at the department of physics and astrophysics, University of Delhi as a research associate, of CSIR, followed by a two years position as the senior research associate of CSIR at the same institute. Following an appointment on a permanent position as a lecturer in physics at Kirori Mal College, University of Delhi, in March 2006, Kulshreshtha got promoted at the same institute first as a senior lecturer in physics with effect from March 2006 and then as a reader in physics with effect from February 2007 and then as an associate professor of physics with effect from February 2010 and eventually as a full professor of physics with effect from July 2019 at the same institute where she continues to hold this permanent position till date. Since 2011 she was several times visiting faculty in the Theory Group of Nuclear Physics at Iowa State University and in the Field Theory Group of the Carl von Ossietzky University of Oldenburg.

== Research ==
Kulshreshtha's research focuses on the Dirac's instant-form and light-front quantization of quantum field theory models, string theory models and D-brane actions using the Hamiltonian, path integral and BRST quantization procedures, constrained dynamics and construction and quantization of gauge theories as well as the study of boson stars and wormholes in general relativity and gravity theory. She was awarded the Gerry McCartor Award for the year 2010 by the International Light Cone Advisory Committee. She helped organize the 2012 International Conference on Light-Cone Physics at the University of Delhi. She also studies the boson stars and wormholes in general relativity and gravity theory, work which was profiled by the American Physical Society's PhysicsCentral site.,

Kulshreshtha has written over 70 scientific articles, which have received a large number of citations.

== Notable collaborators ==
Harald J. W. Mueller-Kirsten, Jutta Kunz, James P. Vary, Daya Shankar Kulshreshtha, Sanjeev Kumar
