= Daya Shankar Kulshreshtha =

Indian theoretical physicist

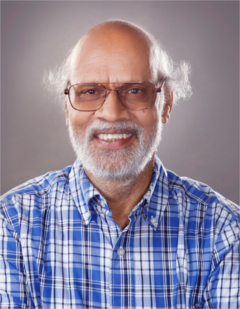
- Daya Shankar Kulshreshtha at Delhi University in August 2017
- Born: December 5, 1951 (age 74); Shivpuri, India
- Education: Delhi University; Jiwaji University
- Known for: Quantum field theory, Light front quantization, Boson stars
- Scientific career
- Fields: Theoretical Physics
- Workplaces: University of Delhi
- Doctoral advisor: R. P. Saxena (Delhi)

Daya Shankar Kulshreshtha (born December, 1951) is an Indian theoretical physicist, specializing in formal aspects of quantum field theory, string theory, supersymmetry, supergravity and superstring theory, Dirac's instant-form and light-front quantization of field theories and D-brane actions. His work on the models of gravity focuses on the studies of charged compact boson stars and boson shells.

== Education and career ==
Kulshreshtha obtained B.Sc. (1969) and M.Sc. (1971) degrees from Jiwaji University, Gwalior. He received his Ph.D. in 1979 from the University of Delhi, under the supervision of R. P. Saxena. He joined the physics department of Rajdhani College, University of Delhi on a permanent teaching position as a lecturer in physics in October 1978. He worked as a postdoctoral researcher at the University of Kaiserslautern (1982–1984). He then held a five-year position of a UGC-Research Scientist of the University Grants Commission (India) at the University of Delhi (1986–1991) followed by a five-year faculty position at the University of Kaiserslautern, Germany (1990–1994) before being appointed a professor at the University of Delhi in 1994. He was head of the department of the Department of Physics and Astrophysics, University of Delhi for a period of three years during November 2007 - November 2010. He was several times visiting faculty in the Nuclear Theory Group of Iowa State University and in the Field Theory Group of the Institute of Theoretical Physics, University of Oldenburg.

== Research ==
Kulshreshtha's research focuses on formal aspects of quantum field theory, string theory, supersymmetry, supergravity and superstring theory. In particular, he studies the canonical structure, constrained dynamics and Dirac's instant-form and light-front quantization of field theory, string theory and D-brane actions using the Hamiltonian and path integral formulation and the BRST quantization. His work on the models of gravity and general relativity, focuses on the studies of charged compact boson stars and boson shells. This work suggests that an infinite sequence of bifurcation points exists in the phase diagrams of such boson stars.

In the early stages of his research, he also worked on the non-relativistic and relativistic Quark model(s).

== Notable collaborators ==
Asoke Nath Mitra, Harald J. W. Mueller-Kirsten, James P. Vary, Jutta Kunz, Usha Kulshreshtha, Sanjeev Kumar
