= Gray hole =

Gray hole may refer to:

- a form of exotic star
  - Q-star, SUSY Q-ball stars and B-ball stars
  - exotic versions of neutron stars
- a form of packet drop attack
