= Ring planet =

Ring planet could refer to the following topics:

- Saturn, the sixth planet in the Solar System
- Ring system, ring systems around planets in general
- Ringworld, novel by Larry Niven
- Toroidal planet, a hypothetical type of planet shaped like a ring
