= XTE J1739−285 =

Neutron star in the constellation Ophiuchus

Observation data Epoch J2000 Equinox ICRS
- Constellation: Ophiuchus
- Right ascension: 17^{h} 39^{m} 53.4^{s}
- Declination: −28° 29′ 43″

Characteristics
- Spectral type: Q

Astrometry
Distance	4,000 pc

Details
Mass	1.51 M_{☉}
Radius	10.9 km

Other designations
- SWIFT J1740.6−2821B

Database references
SIMBAD	data

XTE J1739−285 is a low-mass X-ray binary in the constellation Ophiuchus, situated approximately 13,000 light-years from Earth. It was first observed on 19 October 1999 by NASA's Rossi X-ray Timing Explorer satellite.

It had previously been claimed that XTE J1739−285 was the fastest-spinning celestial body yet known, with a frequency of 1122 Hz. However, a re-analysis of these data by other astronomers has been unable to reproduce this result.

XTE J1739−285 has been proposed as a possible quark star, as well as 3C 58.
