= Hexaquark =

Hypothetical particles made up of six quarks or antiquarks

In particle physics, hexaquarks, alternatively known as sexaquarks, are a large family of hypothetical particles, each particle consisting of six quarks or antiquarks of any flavours. Six constituent quarks in any of several combinations could yield a colour charge of zero; for example a hexaquark might contain either six quarks, resembling two baryons bound together (a dibaryon), or three quarks and three antiquarks. Once formed, dibaryons are predicted to be fairly stable by the standards of particle physics.

Notably, the deuteron was detected in 1932 by Urey, Brickwedde, and Murphy, making this the first dibaryon detection. The deuteron is similar to a hydrogen nucleus in that it is formed of one neutron and one proton.

A number of experiments have been suggested to detect dibaryon decays and interactions. In the 1990s, several candidate dibaryon decays were observed but they were not confirmed.

There is a theory that strange particles such as hyperons and dibaryons could form in the interior of a neutron star, changing its mass–radius ratio in ways that might be detectable. Dibaryons produce a Bose–Einstein condensate, which, within the ideal gas approximation, contributes no pressure, resulting in zero incompressibility and a loss of stability of the self-gravitating matter. Accordingly, measurements of neutron stars could set constraints on possible dibaryon properties. A large fraction of the neutrons in a neutron star could turn into hyperons and merge into dibaryons during the early part of its collapse into a black hole. These dibaryons would very quickly dissolve into quark–gluon plasma during the collapse, or go into some currently unknown state of matter.

== D-star hexaquark ==
In 2014, a potential dibaryon was detected at the Jülich Research Center at about 2380 MeV. The center claimed that the measurements confirm results from 2011, via a more replicable method. The particle existed for 10^{−23} seconds and was named d*(2380). This particle is hypothesized to consist of three up and three down quarks, and has been proposed as a candidate for dark matter.

The study found that production of stable d*(2380) hexaquarks could account for 85% of the Universe's dark matter.

== H dibaryon ==
In 1977, Robert Jaffe proposed that a possibly stable H dibaryon with the quark composition udsuds could notionally result from the combination of two uds hyperons. There is also a state with the same quark content but hypothesised to be compact and stable, for which the name sexaquark is often specifically used.

== Others ==
- In 2022 Riken researchers studied the existence of triply charmed dibaryon $\Omega_{ccc}\Omega_{ccc}$ concluding computationally that it should fall within a feasible regime.

== See also ==
- Deuteron, the only known stable composite particle that consists of six quarks.
- Dineutron, an unstable dibaryon.
- Diproton, another unstable dibaryon.
- Exotic hadron
- Pentaquark
