= Exotic star =

Hypothetical types of stars

An exotic star is a hypothetical compact star composed of exotic matter (something not made of electrons, protons, neutrons, or muons), and balanced against gravitational collapse by degeneracy pressure or other quantum properties.

Types of exotic stars include

- quark stars (composed of quarks)
- strange stars (composed of strange quark matter, a condensate of up, down, and strange quarks)
- preon stars (speculative material composed of preons, which are hypothetical particles and "building blocks" of quarks and leptons, should quarks be decomposable into component sub-particles).

Of the various types of exotic star proposed, the most well evidenced and understood is the quark star, although its existence is not confirmed.

== Quark stars and strange stars ==
A quark star is a hypothesized object that results from the decomposition of neutrons into their constituent quarks under extremely intense gravitational pressure balanced by electrical repulsion and degeneracy pressure. Such a star would be smaller and denser than a neutron star, and may survive in this new state indefinitely, if no extra mass is added. Quark stars that contain strange matter are called strange stars. Such a star, first proposed by Edward Witten, would consist of confined quarks, essentially a giant nucleon.

Based on observations released by the Chandra X-Ray Observatory on 10 April 2002, two objects, named RX J1856.5−3754 and 3C 58, were suggested as quark star candidates. The former appeared to be much smaller and the latter much colder than expected for a neutron star, suggesting that they were composed of material denser than neutronium. However, these observations were met with skepticism by researchers who said the results were not conclusive. After further analysis, RX J1856.5−3754 was excluded from the list of quark star candidates.

== Electroweak stars ==
An electroweak star is a hypothetical type of exotic star in which the gravitational collapse of the star is prevented by radiation pressure resulting from electroweak burning; that is, the energy released by the conversion of quarks to leptons by the electroweak force. This proposed process might occur in a volume at the star's core approximately the size of an apple, containing about two Earth masses, and reaching temperatures on the order of 10^{15} K (1 PK). Electroweak stars could be identified through the equal number of neutrinos emitted of all three generations, taking into account neutrino oscillation.

== Preon stars ==
A preon star is a proposed type of compact star made of preons, a group of hypothetical subatomic particles. Preon stars would be expected to have huge densities, exceeding 10^{23} kg/m^{3}. They may have greater densities than quark stars, and they would be heavier but smaller than white dwarfs and neutron stars.

== Boson stars ==
A boson star is a hypothetical astronomical object formed out of particles called bosons. Conventional stars are formed from mostly protons and electrons, which are fermions, but also contain a large proportion of helium-4 nuclei, which are bosons, and smaller amounts of various heavier nuclei, which can be either. For this type of star to exist, there must be a stable type of boson with self-repulsive interaction; one possible candidate particle is the still-hypothetical "axion" (which is also a candidate for the not-yet-detected "non-baryonic dark matter" particles, which appear to compose roughly 25% of the mass of the Universe). It is theorized that unlike normal stars (which emit radiation due to gravitational pressure and nuclear fusion), boson stars would be transparent and invisible. The immense gravity of a compact boson star would bend light around the object, creating an empty region resembling the shadow of a black hole's event horizon. Like a black hole, a boson star would absorb ordinary matter from its surroundings, but because of the transparency, matter (which would probably heat up and emit radiation) would be visible at its center. Rotating boson star models are also possible. Unlike black holes these have quantized angular momentum, and their energy density profiles are torus-shaped, which can be understood as a result of deformation due to centrifugal forces.

There is no significant evidence that such stars exist. However, it may become possible to detect them by the gravitational radiation emitted by a pair of co-orbiting boson stars. GW190521, thought to be the most energetic black hole merger ever recorded, may be the head-on collision of two boson stars. In addition, gravitational wave signals from compact binary boson star mergers can be degenerate with those from black hole mergers, suggesting that some gravitational wave observations interpreted as originating in a black hole binary could really originate in a boson star binary. The invisible companion to a Sun-like star identified by Gaia mission could be a black hole or either a boson star or an exotic star of other types.

Boson stars may have formed through gravitational collapse during the primordial stages of the Big Bang. At least in theory, a supermassive boson star could exist at the core of a galaxy, resulting in effects similar to a supermassive black hole. However, more recent general-relativistic magnetohydrodynamic simulations, combined with imaging performed by the Event Horizon Telescope, is believed to have largely ruled out the possibility that Sagittarius A*, the supermassive object at the center of the Milky Way, could be a boson star.

Bound states in cosmological bosonic fields have also been proposed as an alternative to dark matter. The dark matter haloes surrounding most galaxies might be viewed as enormous "boson stars."

Compact boson stars and boson shells are often modelled using massive bosonic fields, such as complex scalar fields and U(1) gauge fields, coupled to gravity. The presence of a positive or negative cosmological constant in the theory facilitates a study of these objects in de Sitter and anti-de Sitter spaces.

By changing the potential associated with the matter model, different families of boson star models can be obtained. The so-called solitonic potential, which introduces a degenerate vacuum state at a finite value of the field amplitude, can be used to construct boson star models so compact that they possess a pair of photon orbits, one of which is stable. Because they trap light, such boson stars could mimic much of the observational phenomenology of black holes.

Boson stars composed of elementary particles with spin-1 have been labelled Proca stars.

== Planck stars ==
In loop quantum gravity, a Planck star is a hypothetically possible astronomical object that is created when the energy density of a collapsing star reaches the Planck energy density. Under these conditions, assuming gravity and spacetime are quantized, there arises a repulsive "force" derived from Heisenberg's uncertainty principle. In other words, if gravity and spacetime are quantized, the accumulation of mass-energy inside the Planck star cannot collapse beyond this limit to form a gravitational singularity because it would violate the uncertainty principle for spacetime itself.

== Q-stars ==
Q-stars are hypothetical objects that originate from supernovae or the big bang. They are theorized to be massive enough to bend space-time to a degree such that some, but not all light could escape from its surface. These are predicted to be denser than neutron stars or even quark stars.

== Dark stars ==
In Newtonian mechanics, objects dense enough to trap any emitted light are called dark stars, as opposed to black holes in general relativity. However, the same name is used for hypothetical ancient "stars" which derived energy from dark matter. Quantum effects may prevent true black holes from forming and give rise instead to dense entities called black stars.

== See also ==
- Quasi-star – Hypothetical early-universe star with a black hole core
- Quark-nova – Hypothetical explosion of a neutron star
- Electron degeneracy pressure – Repulsive force in quantum mechanics

== Sources ==
- Hansson, Johan (2007). "A hierarchy of cosmic compact objects – without black holes" (PDF). Acta Physica Polonica B. 38 (1): 91. arXiv:astro-ph/0603342. Bibcode:2007AcPPB..38...91H. Archived from the original (PDF) on 29 April 2014.
- Hansson, Johan; Sandin, Fredrik (2007). "Observational legacy of preon stars: Probing new physics beyond the CERN LHC". Physical Review D. 76 (12) 125006. arXiv:astro-ph/0701768. Bibcode:2007PhRvD..76l5006S. doi:10.1103/PhysRevD.76.125006. S2CID 116307455.
- Horvath, J.E. (2007). "Constraints on superdense preon stars and their formation scenarios". Astrophysics and Space Science. 307 (4): 419–422. arXiv:astro-ph/0702288. Bibcode:2007Ap&SS.307..419H. doi:10.1007/s10509-007-9392-0. S2CID 16414712.
- Sandin, Fredrik (2007). Exotic Phases of Matter in Compact Stars. Department of Applied Physics and Mechanical Engineering / Division of Physics (Ph.D. thesis). Luleå, Sweden: Luleå Tekniska Universitet [Luleå University of Technology]. ISSN 1402-1544.
- "Splitting the quark". Nature. November 2007.
- "A new way to shine, a new kind of star". SpaceDaily. 16 December 2009.
