= Sarah T. Stewart-Mukhopadhyay =

American planetary scientist

Dr. Sarah Toby Stewart-Mukhopadhyay
- Born: 1973 (age 52–53); Taiwan
- Occupation: Planetary Scientist
- Known for: Synestia

Academic background
- Education: Harvard University

Academic work
- Discipline: Planetary science
- Sub-discipline: Astrophysics
- Institutions: Caltech, Harvard University, UC Davis

Sarah T. Stewart-Mukhopadhyay is an American planetary scientist known for studying planet formation, planetary geology, and materials science. She is a professor at the University of California, Davis in the Earth and Planetary Sciences Department. She was a professor at Harvard University Department of Earth and Planetary Sciences from 2003 to 2014.

Stewart-Mukhopadhyay was named as one of the "Brilliant 10" by Popular Science in 2010, one of "Astronomy's Rising Stars" by Astronomy in 2013, and one of the "Top 100 Science Stories of 2015" in Discover. She received an award from the American Astronomical Society for outstanding achievements by a young scientist. She won a MacArthur "Genius" fellowship in 2018.

== Education ==
Stewart-Mukhopadhyay received her undergraduate degree in astrophysics and physics from Harvard in 1995. She completed her PhD at the California Institute of Technology in 2002.

== Career and research ==
Stewart-Mukhopadhyay is director of the Shock Compression Laboratory. At Caltech, she was the first to study shock propagation in ice under similar conditions found in the Solar System. Her research group is interested in planetary formation, particularly with giant impacts and impact cratering.

She was awarded the Urey Prize in 2009. Her work on shock-induced ice melting helped to show that liquid water is the most erosive fluid currently at work on the surface of Mars.

One of the tools at the Shock Compression Laboratory is a 40 mm cannon. The shock lab has been located at UC Davis since 2016. Her group also does experiments at the Z Machine at Sandia National Laboratory to study shock-induced vaporization.

Stewart-Mukhopadhyay proposed a version of the giant impact hypothesis in which an oblate Earth was slowed from a 2.3-hour long day, and allowed to become spherical, by an impact with the planet Theia.

In 2018 Simon J. Lock, Sarah Stewart-Mukhopadhyay, et al. hypothesized a new kind of astronomical object – a synestia – and proposed a new model of how the Earth and Moon were formed.

== Awards and honors ==
- In 2023, she was named a Fellow of the American Physical Society, "for the development and application of shock physics techniques to explain the origin and evolution of planetary systems".
- In 2018, she was awarded the MacArthur Fellowship for "advancing new theories of how celestial collisions give birth to planets and their natural satellites, such as the Earth and Moon".
- In 2009, she received the American Astronomical Society's Harold C. Urey Prize from the Division for Planetary Sciences.
- In 2003, she received the Presidential Early Career Award for Scientists and Engineers.
- In 2002, she began the Grove Karl Gilbert Postdoctoral Fellowship at Carnegie Institution of Washington.
- In 2001, she received the Stephen E. Dwornik Planetary Geoscience Student Paper Award, Geological Society of America.

== Personal life ==
Stewart was born in Taiwan, where her father was stationed in the Air Force. Stewart's husband, Sujoy Mukhopadhyay, is also a professor and planetary scientist at UC Davis.

== See also ==
- Water on Mars
- Shock waves in astrophysics
