= RX J1856.5−3754 =

Star in the constellation Corona Australis

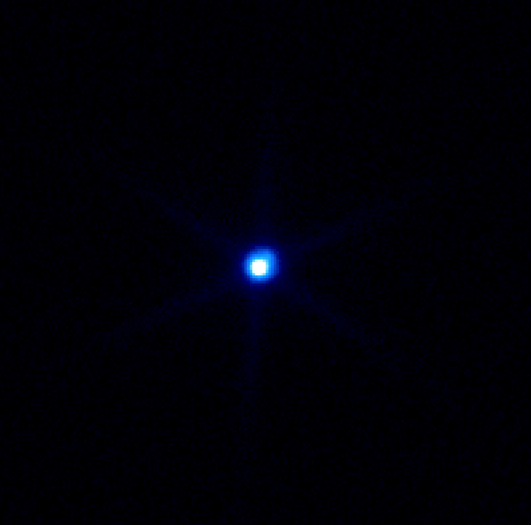
- X-ray image of RX J1856.5−3754

Observation data Epoch 1996.7 Equinox J2000.0
- Constellation: Corona Australis
- Right ascension: 18^{h} 56^{m} 35.41^{s}
- Declination: −37° 54′ 35.8″
- Apparent magnitude (V): ~25.6

Details
| Mass | $1.5\pm0.2$ M_{☉} |
| Radius | $12.1^{+1.3}_{-1.6}$ km |
| Age | 1 Myr |

Other designations
- RX J185635−3754, 1ES 1853−37.9, 1RXS J185635.1−375433

Database references
| SIMBAD | data |

RX J1856.5−3754 (also called RX J185635−3754, RX J185635−375, and various other designations) is a neutron star in the constellation Corona Australis. At approximately 400 light-years from Earth, it is the closest neutron star discovered to date.

== Discovery and location ==
Zooming in on the very faint neutron star RX J1856.5–3754

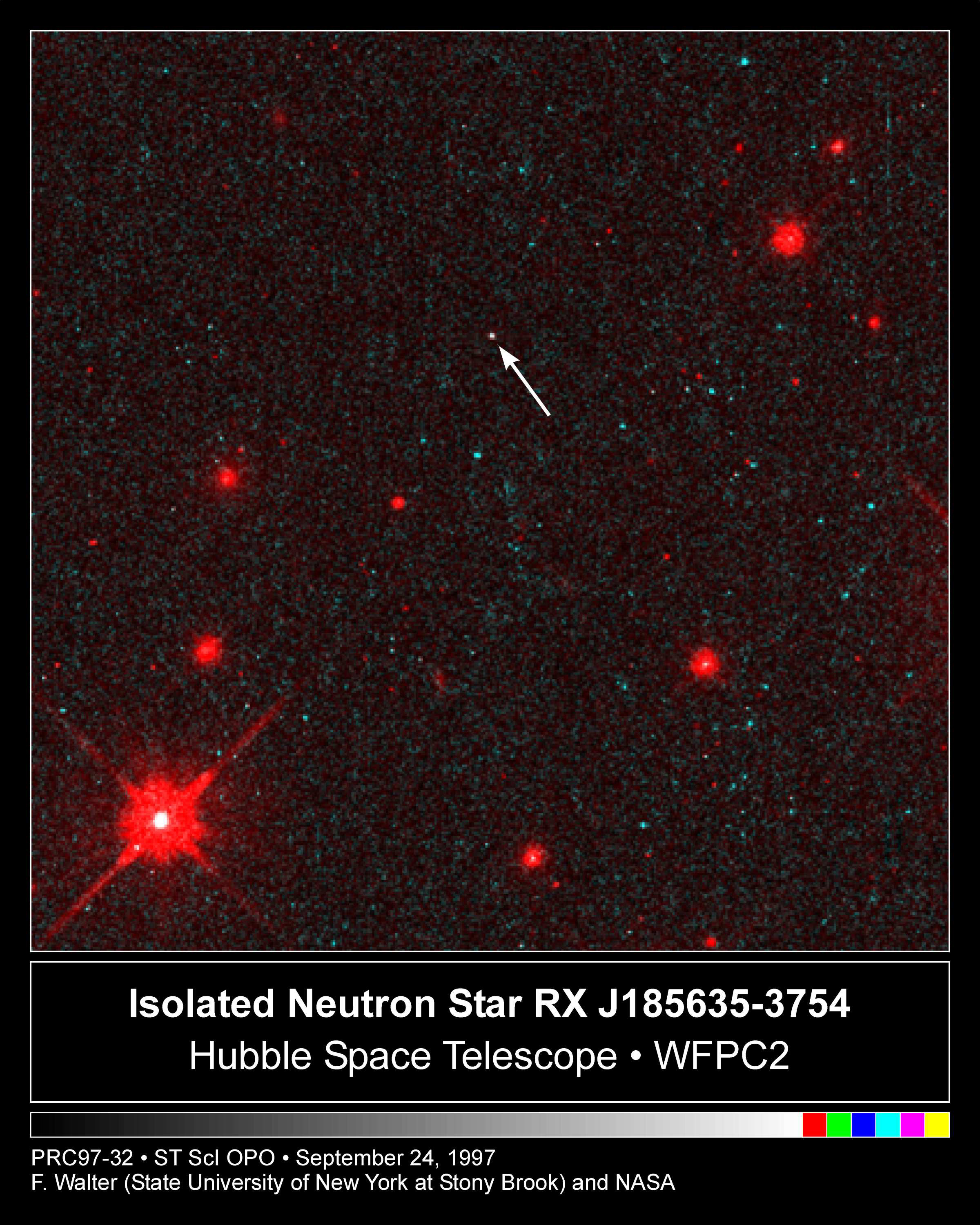
Hubble image of RX J1856.5−3754—the first direct observation of an isolated neutron star in visible light

RX J1856.5−3754 is thought to have formed in a supernova explosion of its companion star about one million years ago and is moving across the sky at 108 km/s. It was discovered in 1992, and observations in 1996 confirmed that it is a neutron star, the closest to Earth discovered to date.

It was originally thought to be about 150–200 light-years away, but further observations using the Chandra X-ray Observatory in 2002 indicate that its distance is greater—about 400 light-years.

RX J1856 is one of the Magnificent Seven, a group of young neutron stars at distances between 130 and 500 parsecs (420 and 1,630 light-years) of Earth.

== Quark star hypothesis ==
By combining Chandra X-ray Observatory and Hubble Space Telescope data, astronomers previously estimated that RX J1856 radiates like a solid body with a temperature of 700000 °C and has a diameter of about 4–8 km. This estimated size was too small to reconcile with the standard models of neutron stars, and it was therefore suggested that it might be a quark star.

However, later refined analysis of improved Chandra and Hubble observations revealed that the surface temperature of the star is lower, only 434000 °C, and, consequently, the radius is larger, about 14 km (the observed radius appears about 17 km due to general-relativistic effects). Thus, RX J1856.5–3754 is now excluded from the list of quark star candidates. A subsequent more accurate parallax estimation has led to the correction of this result to 12.1+1.3
−1.6 km for the true radius (and about 15 km for the observed radius).

== Vacuum birefringence ==
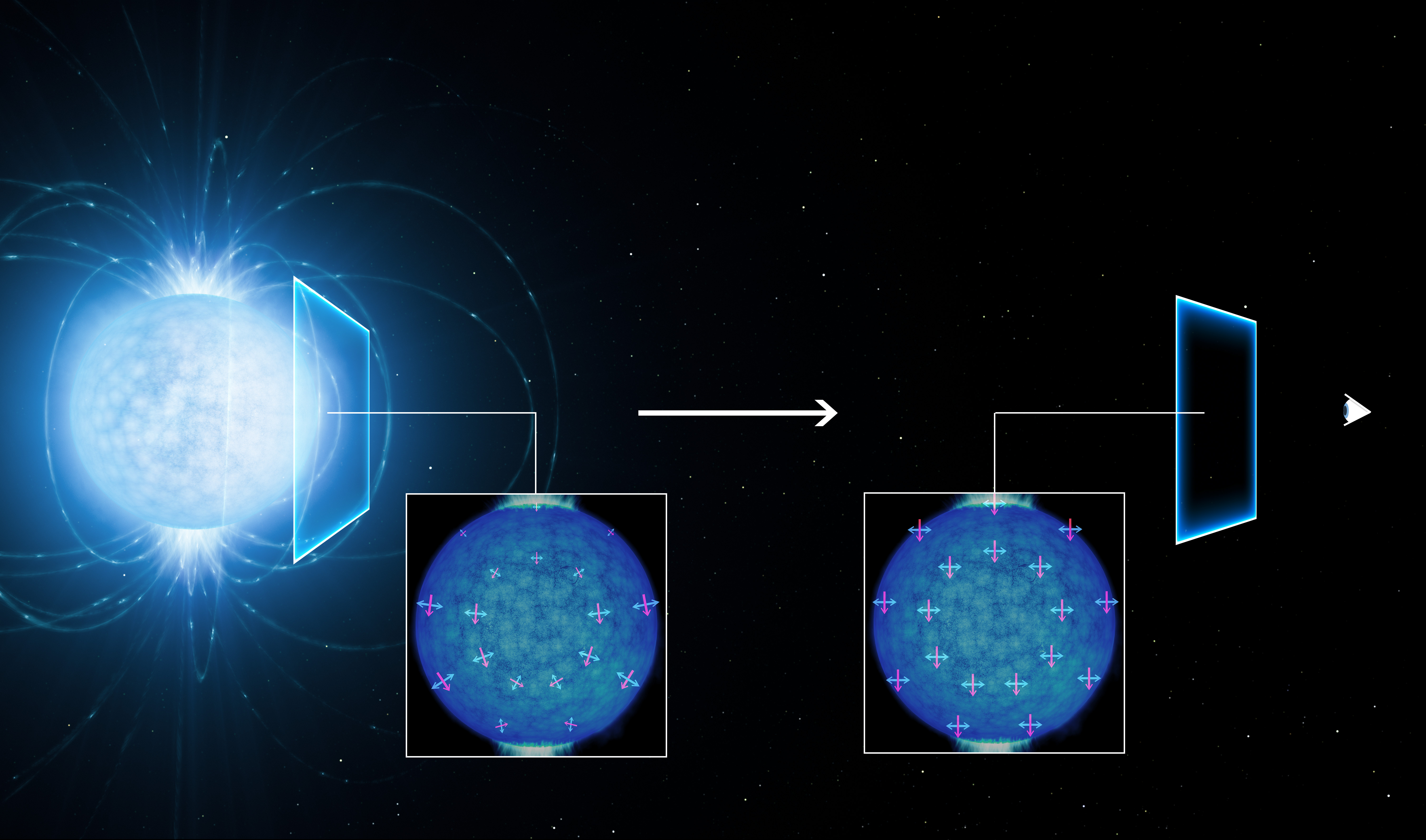
The polarization of the observed light in the extremely strong magnetic field suggests that the empty space around the neutron star is subject to the vacuum birefringence.

In 2016 a team of astronomers from Italy, Poland, and the UK using the Very Large Telescope reported observational indications of vacuum birefringence from RX J1856.5−3754. A degree of polarization of about 16% was measured from the visible spectrum being large enough to support-evidence but not discovery due to the low accuracy of star model and the uncertain direction of the neutron magnetization axis.

Its inferred magnetic field of 10^{13} G should produce a greater effect at X-ray wavelengths, which could be measured by future planned polarimeters, such as NASA's Imaging X-ray Polarimeter Explorer (IXPE), NASA's Polarimetry of Relativistic X-ray Sources (PRAXYS), or ESA's X-ray Imaging Polarimetry Explorer (XIPE).

== See also ==
- 3C 58, a possible quark star
