= Buchdahl star =

Hypothetical maximally compact horizonless object

In general relativity, a Buchdahl star is a hypothetical compact object whose boundary lies at the smallest radius permitted by Buchdahl's theorem, making it the most compact static configuration that does not possess an event horizon. Its surface radius is nine eighths of the Schwarzschild radius of an object of the same mass, so that the configuration lies just outside the radius at which a horizon would form. The same configuration is also called a Buchdahl sphere, and the charged analogue a Buchdahl shell. Because its external gravitational field is indistinguishable from that of a black hole of equal mass while its boundary remains timelike, the object has been discussed as a candidate black hole mimicker.

== Definition ==
Buchdahl showed in 1959 that a static, spherically symmetric body made of a perfect fluid whose density does not increase outwards, and whose interior is matched to the exterior Schwarzschild vacuum, must satisfy the compactness inequality M/R ≤ 4/9 in geometrized units. A Buchdahl star is defined by the saturation of this inequality. An equivalent and more general characterisation uses the gravitational potential Φ(R) felt by a radially infalling test particle at the surface: a black hole corresponds to Φ(R) = 1/2, which fixes the horizon, while a Buchdahl star corresponds to Φ(R) = 4/9, with the compactness bound written as Φ(R) ≤ 4/9. This form applies to charged as well as neutral bodies, the electrostatic field energy outside the surface being subtracted from the mass; for a charged object with α = Q/M the limiting radius is shifted accordingly, and the extremal value is reached at α² = 9/8.

== Energy interpretation and the virial theorem ==
An alternative formulation of the bound rests on the division of the total energy of a collapsing configuration into a gravitational and a non-gravitational part. Using the Brown–York quasilocal energy to measure the energy enclosed within a given radius, the compactness limit becomes the requirement that the gravitational field energy not exceed half of the non-gravitational matter energy, the two being equal at a black hole horizon. Since the energy gained during collapse appears as internal energy in the interior, saturation of the ratio at one half has been interpreted as a relativistic counterpart of the Newtonian virial theorem, in which the mean kinetic energy equals half the mean potential energy. A covariant geometrical version of this correspondence has been given in terms of the expansion and shear of the matter congruence. A consequence of this reading is that no fluid obeying an equation of state can actually reach the limit, because the central pressure of the limiting constant-density configuration diverges, so that a kinetic matter source of freely moving particles interacting only gravitationally has been proposed instead. For such Vlasov matter, the bound is approached by configurations tending to a thin shell.

== Rotation and status ==
No exact solution describing a rotating body without a horizon is known in general relativity, since rotation generates multipole moments that the Kerr metric cannot accommodate, and studies of rotating configurations therefore either treat the Kerr geometry as an approximation or work to second order in the spin using the Hartle–Thorne metric. Within the Kerr approximation an ergoregion forms outside the surface only above a threshold spin of 1/√2, below which rotational energy cannot be extracted, while above it the Penrose process and its magnetic variant operate with efficiencies comparable to or, for a surface-supported dipolar field, exceeding those of a black hole of the same mass. The status of the bound itself has also been reexamined: for elastic matter with constant longitudinal wave speeds the Buchdahl value can be exceeded, with causality limiting the compactness to about 0.462 and radial stability to about 0.389, and more generally the assumptions of Buchdahl's theorem provide a scheme for classifying proposed horizonless alternatives to black holes according to which assumption they relax. No object of this kind has been observed, and no matter configuration realising one is known.
