= Synestia =

Hypothesized entity in outer space

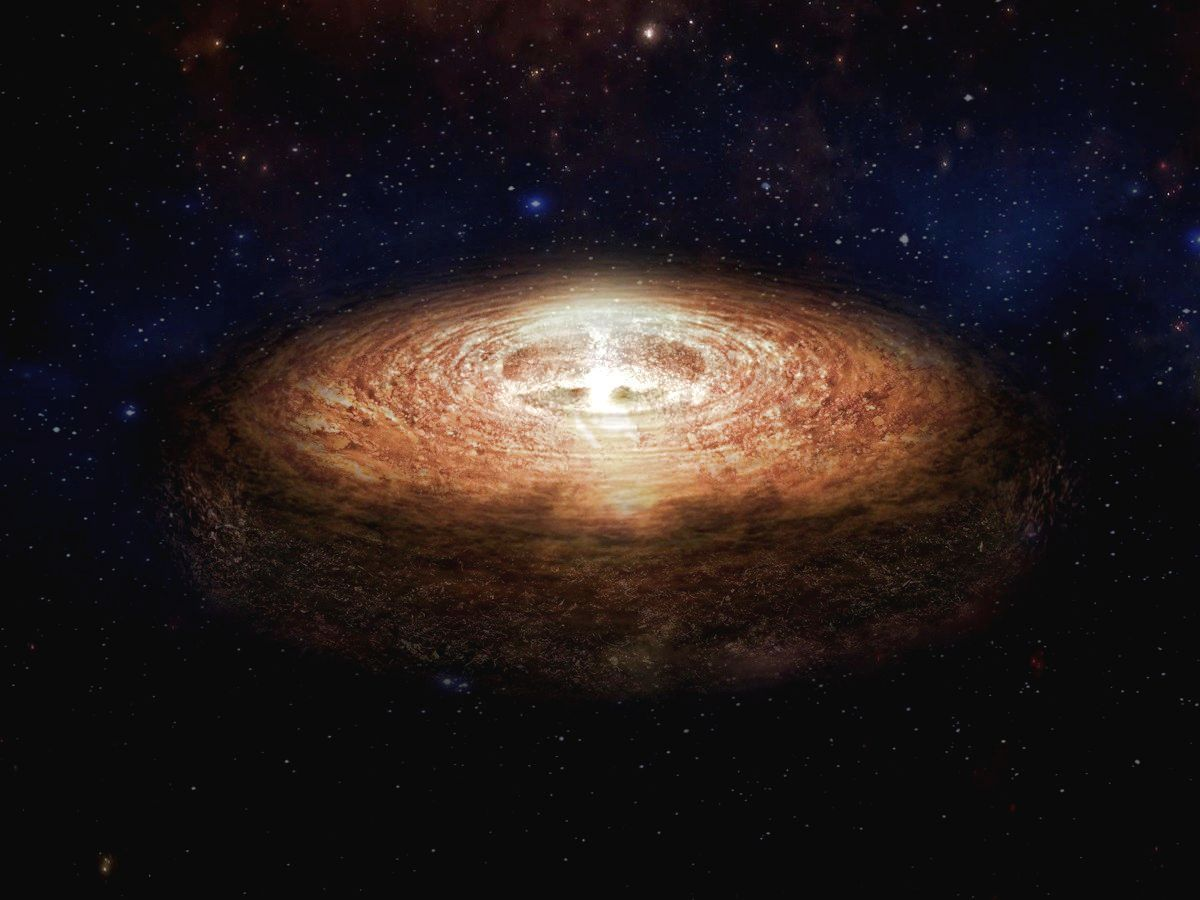
Artistic impression

A synestia is a hypothesized structure for the debris field generated by the collision of planets: a rapidly spinning doughnut-shaped mass of vaporized rock. The term was coined in 2017 by Sarah T. Stewart-Mukhopadhyay, taken from Hestia, goddess of the hearth, combined with syn- meaning together. In computer simulations of giant impacts of rotating objects, a synestia can form if the total angular momentum is greater than the co-rotational limit. Beyond the co-rotational limit, the velocity at the equator of a body would exceed the orbital velocity.

In the case of a synestia, the result is an inner region rotating at a single rate with a loosely connected torus orbiting beyond it. Synestias also have differences in the mantles, both thermally and in their composition, from previous terrestrial evolution models due partially to a lower interior pressure.

== Composition ==
A synestia is composed of three primary components: the innermost area called the corotating region, a middle area called the transition region, and the area farthest out, known as the disk-like region. The corotating region rotates as a solid body. It is characterized by hot vapor and high entropy levels, as well as higher angular velocities.

The transition region is generally a continuous change between the corotating region and ring-like region. Here, in most simulations, the angular velocity and temperature follow a smooth gradient, both decreasing with radius. The temperature gradient is created by the mixture of hot vapor from the inner regions with colder condensed material from farther out. Given time this equilibrates into solely a vapor. This transitions into the disk-like region whose appearance can vary dramatically with different initial conditions for angular momentum, mass, and entropy.

== Giant-impact hypothesis ==
According to studies, synestia was an early-stage process for the formation of the Earth and Moon within the giant-impact hypothesis. In that model, a synestia formed following a collision with an object of high energy and high angular momentum. The synestia's surface temperatures are constrained by the boiling point of rock, around 2,300 K (approximately 2,000 °C; 3,700 °F).

As the resulting synestia cooled by radiating heat to space, magma droplets formed in its outer layers and then rained inward over a period of tens of years, causing the synestia to contract. Mass remaining outside the Roche limit of the inner region accreted to form moonlets, and subsequently combined to form the Moon. The Earth re-formed later, once the synestia had cooled sufficiently to fall within the co-rotational limit. By this model, the Moon's having formed within a cloud of vapor that originated from the Earth is why its isotopic ratios are similar to those of the Earth. The later formation of the Earth (after the synestia cooled) accounts for its having accreted more volatile elements than the Moon.

== See also ==
- Toroidal planet
