= Jutta Kunz =

German physicist

- Born: 6 July 1955 (age 71); Giessen, Germany
- Education: University of Giessen
- Known for: Quantum field theory, General relativity, Black holes, Wormholes, Solitons, Neutron stars, Boson stars, Boson shells, Black rings, Black branes, Models of gravity in four and higher dimensions.
- Scientific career
- Fields: Theoretical Physics, Quantum field theory, General relativity
- Workplaces: University of Oldenburg
- Doctoral advisors: Ulrich Mosel (Giessen), Larry Wilets (Seattle)

Jutta Kunz (born 6 July 1955) is a German physicist, specializing in quantum field theory and general relativity. Her work focuses on the gravity in four and higher dimensions: models of gravity, black holes, wormholes, solitons, neutron stars, boson stars, boson shells, black rings and black branes.

== Education and career ==
Kunz obtained her master's degree (Diplom) in physics from Justus-Liebig University, Giessen, Germany (1978). She did her graduate studies in Physics at the University of Washington, Seattle, USA (1978–79). She obtained her Ph.D. (Dr. rer. nat. (summa cum laude)) (1982). She held the Post-Doc position at the Los Alamos National Laboratory, Los Alamos, USA (1982–84) and subsequently the position of a Hochschulassistentin (C1) at the Justus-Liebig University Giessen, Germany (1984–87). She held the fellowship of the DFG at Nikhef, Amsterdam, the Netherlands (1987–89).

She received her Dr. Habil from the Carl von Ossietzky University of Oldenburg, Germany (1989). She held the position of a research assistant at NIKHEF, Amsterdam, the Netherlands (1989–90) and then a research assistant position at the RU Utrecht, the Netherlands (1990–92). Finally in 1993, she became a professor (C3) at the Carl von Ossietzky University of Oldenburg, Germany where she continues to be a professor till date.

== Research ==
Kunz's research focuses on formal aspects of quantum field theory and general relativity. In particular, she is known for her work on the gravity in four and higher dimensions (models of gravity): black holes, wormholes, solitons, neutron stars, boson stars and boson shells, black rings, black branes in general relativity, electroweak interactions and effective chiral models of QCD. She is a member and one of the co-chairs of the research training group (Graduiertenkolleg) on the models of gravity. Some of her work was profiled by the American Physical Society's PhysicsCentral site.

She has written over a few hundred scientific articles, which have received over a few thousand citations.,
