= Dark star (Newtonian mechanics) =

Object with escape velocity exceeding the speed of light

A dark star is a theoretical object compatible with Newtonian mechanics that, due to its large mass, has a surface escape velocity that equals or exceeds the speed of light. Whether light is affected by gravity under Newtonian mechanics is unclear but if it were accelerated the same way as projectiles, any light emitted at the surface of a dark star would be trapped by the star's gravity, rendering it dark, hence the name. Dark stars are analogous to black holes in general relativity.

== Dark star theory history ==
=== John Michell and dark stars ===
During 1783 geologist John Michell wrote a letter to Henry Cavendish outlining the expected properties of dark stars, published by The Royal Society in their 1784 volume. Michell calculated that when the escape velocity at the surface of a star was equal to or greater than lightspeed, the generated light would be gravitationally trapped so that the star would not be visible to a distant astronomer.

If the semi-diameter of a sphere of the same density as the Sun were to exceed that of the Sun in the proportion of 500 to 1, a body falling from an infinite height towards it would have acquired at its surface greater velocity than that of light, and consequently supposing light to be attracted by the same force in proportion to its vis inertiae, with other bodies, all light emitted from such a body would be made to return towards it by its own proper gravity. This assumes that gravity influences light in the same way as massive objects.

Michell's idea for calculating the number of such "invisible" stars anticipated 20th century astronomers' work: he suggested that since a certain proportion of double-star systems might be expected to contain at least one "dark" star, we could search for and catalogue as many double-star systems as possible, and identify cases where only a single circling star was visible. This would then provide a statistical baseline for calculating the amount of other unseen stellar matter that might exist in addition to the visible stars.

=== Dark stars and gravitational shifts ===
Michell also suggested that future astronomers might be able to identify the surface gravity of a distant star by seeing how far the star's light was shifted to the weaker end of the spectrum, a precursor of Einstein's 1911 gravity-shift argument. However, Michell cited Newton as saying that blue light was less energetic than red (Newton thought that more massive particles were associated with bigger wavelengths), so Michell's predicted spectral shifts were in the wrong direction. It is difficult to tell whether Michell's careful citing of Newton's position on this may have reflected a lack of conviction on Michell's part over whether Newton was correct or just academic thoroughness.

=== Wave theory of light ===
In 1796, the mathematician Pierre-Simon Laplace promoted the same idea in the first and second editions of his book Exposition du système du Monde, independently of Michell.

Because of the development of the wave theory of light, Laplace may have removed it from later editions as light came to be thought of as a massless wave, and therefore not influenced by gravity and as a group, physicists dropped the idea although the German physicist, mathematician, and astronomer Johann Georg von Soldner continued with Newton's corpuscular theory of light as late as 1804.

== Comparisons with black holes ==
=== Radiation ===
Dark stars and black holes both have a surface escape velocity equal or greater than lightspeed, and a critical radius of r ≤ 2M. However, the dark star is capable of emitting indirect radiation – outward-aimed light and matter can leave the r = 2M surface briefly before being recaptured, and while outside the critical surface, can interact with other matter, or be accelerated free from the star through such interactions. A dark star, therefore, has a rarefied atmosphere of "visiting particles", and this ghostly halo of matter and light can radiate, albeit weakly. Also as faster-than-light speeds are possible in Newtonian mechanics, it is possible for particles to escape.

Black holes as described by current theories about quantum mechanics emit radiation through a different process, Hawking radiation, first postulated in 1975. The radiation emitted by a dark star depends on its composition and structure; Hawking radiation, by the no-hair theorem, is generally thought of as depending only on the black hole's mass, charge, and angular momentum, although the black hole information paradox makes this controversial.

=== Light-bending effects ===
If Newtonian physics does have a gravitational deflection of light (Newton, Cavendish, Soldner), general relativity predicts twice as much deflection in a light beam skimming the Sun. This difference can be explained by the additional contribution of the curvature of space under modern theory: while Newtonian gravitation is analogous to the space-time components of general relativity's Riemann curvature tensor, the curvature tensor only contains purely spatial components, and both forms of curvature contribute to the total deflection.

== See also ==
- Black hole
- Magnetospheric eternally collapsing object
- Q star
