= Q star =

Hypothetical compact star

A simple diagram illustrating how some but not all light can escape from a grey hole

A Q-star, also known as a grey hole, is a hypothetical type of compact, heavy neutron star with an exotic state of matter. Such a star can be smaller than the progenitor star's Schwarzschild radius and have a gravitational pull so strong that some light, but not all light, can escape. Light going in the opposite direction of the star’s center would be the most likely to escape from it, while light going in a direction almost parallel to its surface is the most likely not to escape. Light that does escape from this object will likely be gravitationally redshifted. The Q stands for a conserved particle number. A Q-star may be mistaken for a stellar black hole. Some stellar black holes might be grey holes, two of which are V404 Cygni and Cygnus X-1.

== Types of Q-stars ==
- Q-ball
- B-ball, stable Q-balls with a large baryon number B. They may exist in neutron stars that have absorbed Q-ball(s).

== See also ==
- Black hole
  - Stellar black hole
- Compact star
  - Exotic star
    - Boson star
    - Electroweak star
    - Preon star
    - Strange star
    - Quark star
- Non-topological soliton § Soliton-stars
- Gravitational soliton
