= Iron star =

Astronomical category of stars

In astronomy, the term iron star has been used for two observed types of star:

- Binary stars with highly variable emission and stellar spectral type Fe
- a blue supergiant with a forest of forbidden Fe_{II} lines in its spectrum.

It can also refer to the theorized 'iron black dwarf' stellar remnant, which forms in the very distant future.

== XX Oph and AS 325 ==
The term iron star was applied to a star called XX Ophiuchi (XX Oph) or "Merrill's Iron Star" with a complex, highly variable spectrum with a forest of Fe II emission lines. First discovered in 1908 by Williamina Fleming, it was studied over 30 years by Paul W. Merrill. The star is believed to be a non-eclipsing binary star.

A second binary star, AS 325, has a similar spectrum and complex spectral variability and has been characterized as the second iron star.

== Blue supergiant ==
Other sources characterize an iron star as a type of blue supergiant which has a forest of forbidden Fe_{II} lines in its spectrum. They are potentially quiescent hot luminous blue variables. Eta Carinae has been described as a prototypical example.

== Iron black dwarf ==
An iron black dwarf is a hypothetical iron core black dwarf which would only occur in the very distant future on the order of 10^{1500} years, assuming protons do not decay. According to modeling calculations, higher mass black dwarf stars would supernova, becoming the last notable astronomical activity in the universe.

== In popular culture ==
- The Soviet film The Andromeda Nebula is about a starship low on fuel caught by an iron star's gravity, with the star itself being so dim that it can only be seen in the infrared. It is based on the novel Andromeda Nebula by Ivan Yefremov written when steady state theory was dominant and iron stars were expected to exist in the Milky Way.
- In the Wrath of the Gods (mod) add-on for the Calamity Mod (a mod for the video game Terraria), the Avatar of Emptiness boss utilizes an attack where it summons and compresses an iron star to the point of it cracking, causing beams of energy to discharge from the fissures toward the player. The continued compression causes the iron star to eventually explode into damaging debris.

== See also ==
- Future of an expanding universe
- Hypothetical star
- Heat death of the universe
