= Dark star (dark matter) =

Hypothetical star heated by dark-matter annihilation

A dark star is a hypothetical type of star that may have existed early in the universe before conventional stars were able to form and thrive.

== Properties ==
The dark stars would be composed mostly of normal matter, like modern stars, but a high concentration of neutralino dark matter present within them would generate heat via annihilation reactions between the dark-matter particles. This heat would prevent such stars from collapsing into the relatively compact and dense sizes of modern stars and therefore prevent nuclear fusion among the normal matter atoms from being initiated.

Under this model, a dark star is predicted to be an enormous cloud of molecular hydrogen and helium ranging between 1 and 960 astronomical units (AU) in radius; its surface temperature would be around 10,000 K. It is expected that they would grow over time and reach masses up to millions solar masses (10^{6} M_{☉}), up until the point where they exhaust the dark matter needed to sustain them, after which they would collapse.

In the unlikely event that dark stars have endured to the modern era, they could be detectable by their emissions of gamma rays, neutrinos, and antimatter and would be associated with clouds of cold molecular hydrogen gas that normally would not harbor such energetic, extreme, and rare particles.

== Possible dark star candidates ==
In April 2023, a study investigated four extremely redshifted objects discovered by the James Webb Space Telescope. Their study suggested that three of these four, namely JADES-GS-z13-0, JADES-GS-z12-0, and JADES-GS-z11-0, are consistent with being point sources, and further suggested that the only point sources which could exist in this time and be bright enough to be observed at these phenomenal distances and redshifts (z = 10–13) were supermassive dark stars in the early universe, powered by dark matter annihilation. Their spectral analysis of the objects suggested that they were between 500,000 and 1 million solar masses (M_{☉}), as well as having a luminosity of billions of Suns (L_{☉}); they would also likely be huge, possibly with radii surpassing 10,000 solar radii (R_{☉}), far exceeding the size of the largest modern stars.

== See also ==
- Population III star
- Supermassive star
- Quasi-star
- Primordial black hole
