= Toroidal planet =

Planet in the shape of a toroidal or doughnut shape

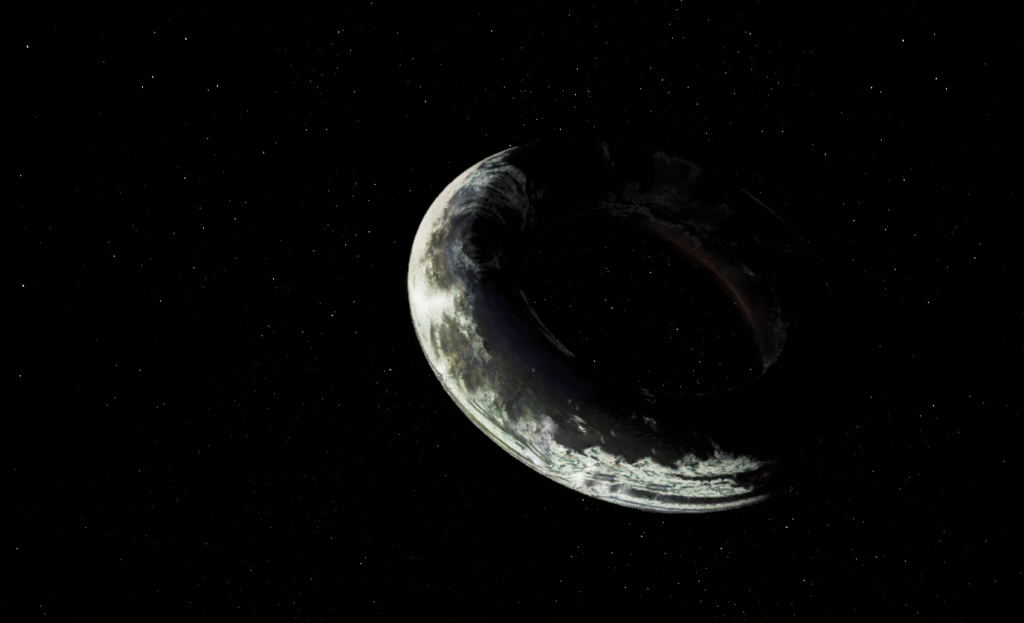
Artist's depiction of an Earth-like toroidal planet. The odds of any toroidal planet forming might be infinitesimally small yet nonzero; in an infinite universe, a 'donut-shaped planet' would almost certainly occur, infinitely often. (Note: Second Borel–Cantelli Lemma, If $\sum^{\infty}_{n = 1} \Pr(E_n) = \infty$ and the events $(E_n)^{\infty}_{n = 1}$ are independent, then $\Pr(\limsup_{n \to \infty} E_n) = 1.$)

A toroidal planet is a hypothetical type of planet with a torus or donut shape. While no firm theoretical understanding as to how toroidal planets could form naturally is necessarily known, the shape itself is potentially quasistable, and is analogous to the physical parameters of a speculatively constructible megastructure in self-suspension, such as a Dyson sphere, ringworld, Stanford torus or Bishop Ring.

== Physical description ==
At sufficiently large enough scales, rigid matter such as the typical silicate-ferrous composition of rocky planets behaves fluidly, and satisfies the condition for evaluating the mechanics of toroidal self-gravitating fluid bodies in context. A rotating mass in the form of a torus allows an effective balance between the gravitational attraction and the force due to centrifugal acceleration, when the angular momentum is adequately large. Ring-shaped masses without a relatively massive central nuclei in equilibrium have been analyzed in the past by Henri Poincaré (1885), Frank W. Dyson (1892), and Sophie Kowalewsky (1885), wherein a condition is allowable for a toroidal rotating mass to be stable with respect to a displacement leading to another toroid. Dyson (1893) investigated other types of distortions and found that the rotating toroidal mass is secularly stable against "fluted" and "twisted" displacements but can become unstable against beaded displacements in which the torus is thicker in some meridians but thinner in some others. In the simple model of parallel sections, beaded instability commences when the aspect ratio of major to minor radius exceeds 3.

Wong (1974) found that toroidal fluid bodies are stable against axisymmetric perturbations for which the corresponding Maclaurin sequence is unstable, yet in the case of non-axisymmetric perturbation at any point on the sequence is unstable. Prior to this, Chandrasekhar (1965, 1967), and Bardeen (1971), had shown that a Maclaurin spheroid with an eccentricity $e \geq 0.98523$ is unstable against displacements leading to toroidal shapes and that this Newtonian instability is excited by the effects of general relativity. Eriguchi and Sugimoto (1981) improved on this result, and Ansorg, Kleinwachter & Meinel (2003) achieved near-machine accuracy, which allowed them to study bifurcation sequences in detail and correct erroneous results.

While an integral expression for gravitational potential of an idealized homogeneous circular torus composed of infinitely thin rings is available, more precise equations are required to describe the expected inhomogeneities in the mass-distribution per the differentiated composition of a toroidal planet. The rotational energy of a toroidal planet in uniform rotation is $E_r = L^2/2I,$ where $L$ is the angular momentum and $I$ the rigid-body moment of inertia about the central symmetry axis. Toroidal planets would experience a tidal force pulling matter in the inner part of toroid toward the opposite rim, consequently flattening the object across the $z$-axis. Tectonic plates drifting hubward would undergo significant contraction, resulting in mountainous convolutions inside the planet's inner region, whereby the elevation of such mountains would be amplified via isostasy due to the reduced gravitational effect in that region.

== Formation ==
Since the existence of toroidal planets is strictly hypothetical, no empirical basis for protoplanetary formation has been established. One homolog is a synestia, a loosely connected doughnut-shaped mass of vaporized rock, proposed by Simon J. Lock and Sarah T. Stewart-Mukhopadhyay to have been responsible for the isotopic similarity in composition, particularly the difference in volatiles, of the Earth-Moon system that occurred during the early-stage process of formation, according to the leading giant-impact hypothesis. The computer modelling incorporated a smoothed particle hydrodynamics code for a series of overlapping constant-density spheroids to obtain the result of a transitional region with a corotating inner region connected to a disk-like outer region.

=== Occurrence ===
To date, no distinctly torus-shaped planet has ever been observed. Given the improbabability of their occurrence, it is extremely unlikely that any will ever be observationally confirmed to exist even within the cosmological horizon; the corresponding search field being approximately $140 \cdot (c/H_0)^3$ Hubble volumes, or $\sim 4.211 \times 10^{32}$ cubic light years.

== See also ==
- Lane–Emden equation – dimensionless form of Poisson's equation for the gravitational potential of a Newtonian self-gravitating, spherically symmetric polytropic fluid
- Synestia
- Circumplanetary disk – Accumulation of matter around a planet
