= James P. Vary =

American theoretical physicist

- Born: May 23, 1943 (age 83); Savanna, Illinois, United States
- Education: Boston College; Yale University
- Known for: Nuclear theory, Elementary Particles, High Energy Physics, Quantum field theory, Light front quantization
- Scientific career
- Fields: Theoretical Physics
- Doctoral advisor: Joseph Ginocchio

James P. Vary (born Savanna, Illinois, May 1943) is an American theoretical physicist and professor at the Iowa State University, specializing in nuclear theory with an emphasis on "ab initio" solutions of quantum many-particle systems and light-front quantum field theory.

== Education and career ==
Vary obtained his B.S. in 1965 from Boston College (Magna cum laude, Scholar of the college), M.S. and Ph.D. degrees from Yale University in 1967 and 1970. His PhD advisor was Joseph Ginocchio.

He was research associate at Center for Theoretical Physics, Massachusetts Institute of Technology (1970–1972), Assistant Physicist, Brookhaven National Laboratory (1972–1974), associate physicist, Brookhaven National Laboratory (1974–1975), assistant professor, Iowa State University, associate professor, Iowa State University. He was Alexander von Humboldt Fellow, University of Heidelberg (1979–1981), before becoming a professor at the Iowa State University in 1981 – a position which he continues to hold.

He also held several visiting positions, including the positions of visiting professor at University of Arizona (1983), Caltech (1986), Ohio State University (1987), Institute for Nuclear Theory, University of Washington (1992 and 2004), Alexander von Humboldt Senior Fellow at the University of Heidelberg (1993), Stanford Linear Accelerator Center, and the Visiting Scientist, Lawrence Livermore National Laboratory (2005–2006).

He has also been the acting director of the International Institute of Theoretical and Applied Physics, Ames, Iowa (1993–1997), director, International Institute of Theoretical and Applied Physics, Ames, Iowa (1997–2000). He leads the nuclear theory group at Iowa State University supported by the US Department of Energy (DOE).

== Scientific research ==
Vary is known for his work in theoretical nuclear physics with an emphasis on effective Hamiltonians for strongly interacting systems and for developing new ab initio approaches to the microscopic structure of nuclei for solving the fundamental nuclear many-body problems as well as problems in light-front quantum field theory including Quantum Chromodynamics.

His work employs similarity transformations, which seek to decouple the “low-energy” degrees of freedom from the “high-energy” degrees of freedom related to the renormalization group approaches in quantum field theory and the non-perturbative Hamiltonian renormalization methods. His work addresses the complex systems, such as the 16-nucleon problem, using realistic microscopic nucleon-nucleon and three-nucleon interactions where only the low-energy modes are retained as well as the finite diagonalization within the low-energy space to obtain the spectra leading to detailed comparisons with experiments. He also focuses on the development of a covariant Hamiltonian light-front approach called the basis light-front quantization (BLFQ) which leads to the ab initio descriptions of the mesons and baryons. He also works on the strong field (non-perturbative) scattering problems with a time-dependent extension to BLFQ (tBLFQ).

He has published over few hundred research articles which have received over several thousand citations.

== Honors and awards ==
- Fellow of the American Physical Society (1989), Councilor (2002–2005), member executive board y (2004–2005)
- Honorary member of the Palestinian Physical Society (1997)
- Chair of the Scientific Program Committee, Light Cone International Conference (2007)
- Member of the National Energy Research Supercomputer Center Users Group Executive Committee (2007–2010)
