= 3C 58 =

Supernova remnant in the constellation of Cassiopeia

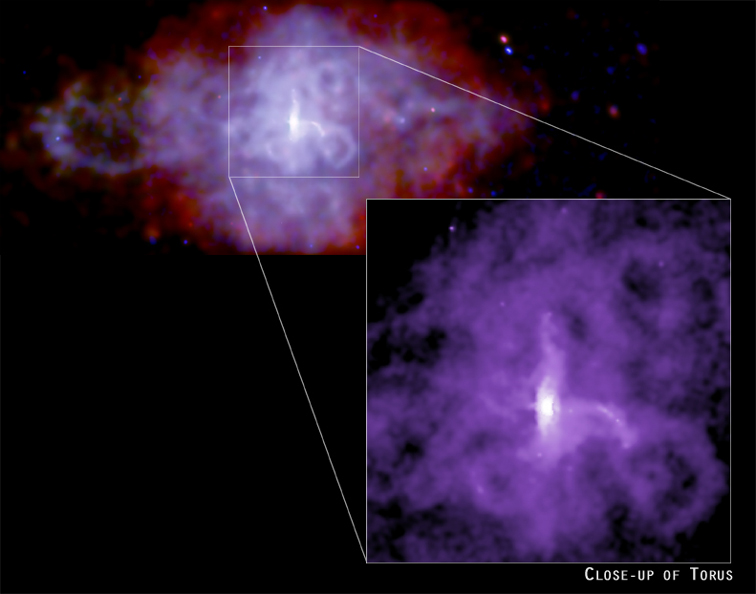
- X-ray image of 3C 58 by the Chandra X-Ray Observatory. The pullout box shows the inner toroidal-shaped nebula

Observation data Epoch J2000.0 Equinox ICRS
- Constellation: Cassiopeia
- Right ascension: 02^{h} 05^{m} 37.0^{s}
- Declination: +64° 49′ 42″
- Apparent magnitude (V): 8.17

Characteristics
- Spectral type: III

Astrometry
Distance	10,000 ly (3067.48 pc)
Absolute magnitude (M_{V})	3.70

Details
Mass	1.36–1.52 M_{☉}
Temperature	150,000 K
Rotation	65.71592849324 ms
Age	5,370 years

Other designations
- SNR G130.7+03.1, ASB 5, RX J0205.5+6449, 1RXS J020529.7+644934, PSR J0205+6449

Database references
SIMBAD	data

3C 58 or 3C58 is a pulsar (designation PSR J0205+6449) and supernova remnant (pulsar wind nebula) within the Milky Way. The object is listed as No. 58 in the Third Cambridge Catalogue of Radio Sources.

It is located 2° northeast of ε Cassiopeiae and is estimated to be 10,000 light-years away. Its rotation period is 65.715 ms (so PSR J0205+6449 does not belong to the class of millisecond pulsars).

The pulsar is notable for its very high rate of cooling, which is unexplained by standard models of neutron star formation. It is hypothesized that extreme conditions in the star's interior cause a high neutrino flux, which carries away the energy so that the star cools. 3C 58 has been proposed as a possible quark star (or strange star).

The age of the 3C 58 remnant has been measured by a number of independent methods. The proper motion of the expanding optical shell of 3C 58 has been measured three times, always with an indicated age of around 3500 years, with this being the direct and distance-independent measure. Estimates from the expansion measurements of the filamentary structure in the radio of the synchrotron nebula suggest the age to roughly 7000 years, independent of distance. Several methods for estimating the remnant's age have proven to have such a large uncertainty as to not be useful, with these methods including those involving the pulsar energetics, the swept-up mass, the pulsar offset from the center of 3C 58, and the changing of the nebular radio brightness. The spin-down age of the pulsar is 5380 years, while the cooling age of the neutron star is >5000 years. Taking all available evidence, 3C 58 has an age somewhere from 3500 to 5500 years.

From 1971 to 2021, 3C 58 has been speculatively connected to the Supernova of 1181 AD, as reported by Chinese and Japanese observers. The basis for this was that 3C 58 was the only supernova remnant known in the large old historical region for the SN 1181. However, multiple factors, including the age (3500 to 5500 years) and energetics of the remnant, all point to 3C 58 as not being the remnant of SN 1181. Further, an analysis of the old East Asian reports used added information on the reported proximity to several old Chinese constellations, and concluded that 3C 58 is at a sky position far outside the error region of the observed SN 1181. A second conclusive argument is that the real remnant of SN 1181 was discovered by American amateur astronomer Dana Patchik, designated Pa 30. Pa 30 is known from multiple independent measures to be a supernova remnant with an age close to 800 years, and it is inside the modern sky position for the 1181 supernova. So 3C 58 is not the remnant left behind by the 1181 supernova.

== See also ==
- RX J1856.5−3754, former quark star candidate
