= Quark star =

Compact exotic star which forms matter consisting mostly of quarks

A quark star is a hypothetical type of compact, exotic star, where extremely high core temperature and pressure have forced nuclear particles to form quark matter, a continuous state of matter consisting of free quarks.

== Background ==
Some massive stars collapse to form neutron stars at the end of their life cycle, as has been both observed and explained theoretically. Under the extreme temperatures and pressures inside neutron stars, the neutrons are normally kept apart by a degeneracy pressure, stabilizing the star and hindering further gravitational collapse. However, it is hypothesized that under even more extreme temperature and pressure, the degeneracy pressure of the neutrons is overcome, and the neutrons are forced to merge and dissolve into their constituent quarks, creating an ultra-dense phase of quark matter based on densely packed quarks. In this state, a new equilibrium is supposed to emerge, as a new degeneracy pressure between the quarks, as well as repulsive electromagnetic forces, will occur and hinder total gravitational collapse that would form a stellar black hole.

If these ideas are correct, quark stars might occur, and be observable, somewhere in the universe. Numerical simulations of the physics inside neutron stars predict quark deconfinement is likely. Such a scenario is seen as scientifically plausible, but has not been proven observationally or experimentally; the very extreme conditions needed for stabilizing quark matter cannot be created in any laboratory and have not been observed directly in nature. The stability of quark matter, and hence the existence of quark stars, is for these reasons among the unsolved problems in physics.

== History ==
The analysis about quark stars was first proposed in 1965 by Soviet physicists D. D. Ivanenko and D. F. Kurdgelaidze. Their existence has not been confirmed.

The equation of state of quark matter is uncertain, as is the transition point between neutron-degenerate matter and quark matter. Theoretical uncertainties have precluded making predictions from first principles. Experimentally, the behaviour of quark matter is being actively studied with particle colliders, but this can only produce very hot (above 10^{12} K) quark–gluon plasma blobs the size of atomic nuclei, which decay immediately after formation. The conditions inside compact stars with extremely high densities and temperatures well below 10^{12} K cannot be recreated artificially, as there are no known methods to produce, store or study "cold" quark matter directly as it would be found inside quark stars. The theory predicts quark matter to possess some peculiar characteristics under these conditions.

== Formation ==
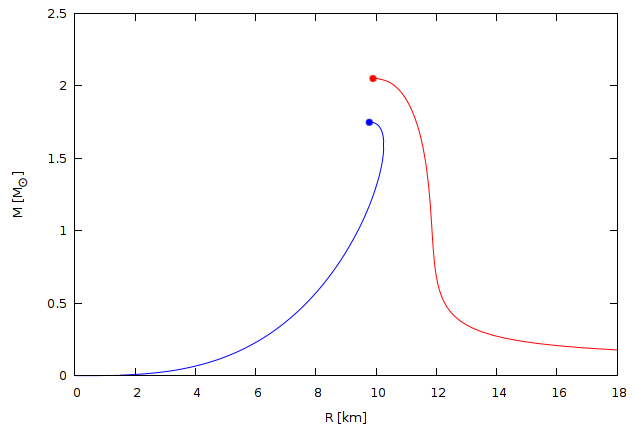
Mass–radius relations for models of a neutron star with no exotic states (red) and a quark star (blue)

It is hypothesized that when the neutron-degenerate matter, which makes up neutron stars, is put under sufficient pressure from the star's own gravity or the initial supernova creating it, the individual neutrons break down into their constituent quarks (up quarks and down quarks), forming what is known as quark matter. This conversion may be confined to the neutron star's center or it might transform the entire star, depending on the physical circumstances. Such a star is known as a quark star.

=== Stability with ordinary quark matter ===
Ordinary quark matter consisting of up and down quarks has a very high Fermi energy compared to ordinary atomic matter and is stable only under extreme temperatures and/or pressures. This suggests that the only stable quark stars will be neutron stars with a quark matter core, while quark stars consisting entirely of ordinary quark matter will be highly unstable and re-arrange spontaneously.

=== Strange stars ===
A strange star also called a strange quark star, is a hypothetical compact astronomical object, a quark star made of strange quark matter. Based on theories of particle physics, strange quark matter would be more stable than ^{56}Fe nuclei, the most stable form of normal nucleons. In these theories, a transition to stable strange quark matter requires simultaneous weak interactions, a requirement which might be satisfied inside neutron stars. Strange quark stars might also be created in the early cosmic phase separations following the Big Bang.

== Characteristics ==
Quark stars have some special characteristics that separate them from ordinary neutron stars. Under the physical conditions found inside neutron stars, with extremely high densities but temperatures well below 10^{12} K, quark matter is predicted to exhibit some peculiar characteristics. It is expected to behave as a Fermi liquid and enter a so-called color-flavor-locked (CFL) phase of color superconductivity, where "color" refers to the six "charges" exhibited in the strong interaction, instead of the two charges (positive and negative) in electromagnetism. At slightly lower densities, corresponding to higher layers closer to the surface of the compact star, the quark matter will behave as a non-CFL quark liquid, a phase that is even more mysterious than CFL and might include color conductivity and/or several additional yet undiscovered phases. None of these extreme conditions can currently be recreated in laboratories so nothing can be inferred about these phases from direct experiments.

== Observed overdense neutron stars ==
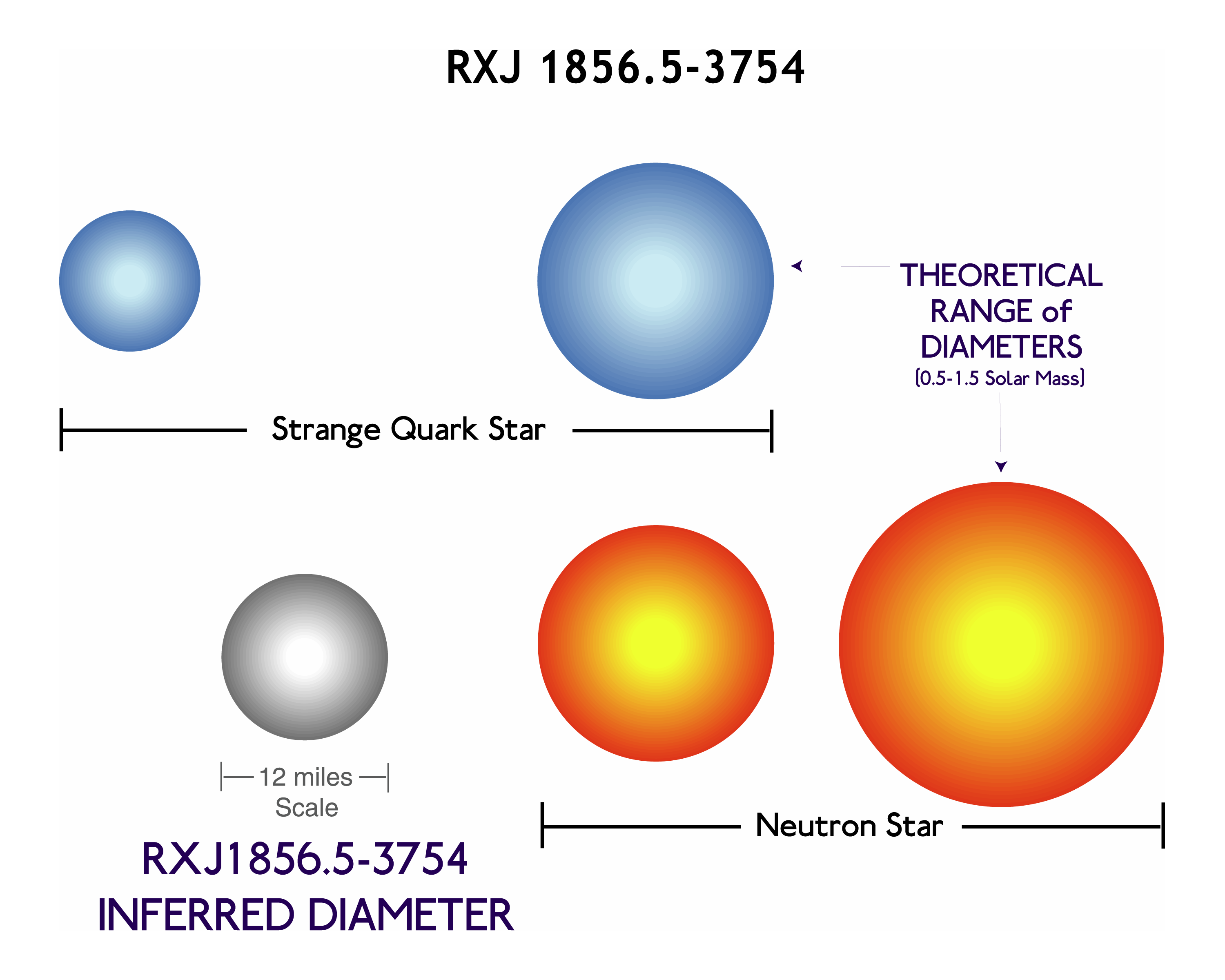
A comparison of the size of quark star candidate RX J1856, based on data from the Chandra X-ray Observatory, to existing models of the theoretical minimum and maximum diameters of neutron and quark stars

At least under the assumptions mentioned above, the probability of a given neutron star being a quark star is low, so in the Milky Way there would only be a small population of quark stars. If it is correct, however, that overdense neutron stars can turn into quark stars, that makes the possible number of quark stars higher than was originally thought, as observers would be looking for the wrong type of star.

A neutron star without deconfinement to quarks and higher densities cannot have a rotational period shorter than a millisecond; even with the unimaginable gravity of such a condensed object the centrifugal force of faster rotation would eject matter from the surface, so detection of a pulsar of millisecond or less period would be strong evidence of a quark star.

Observations released by the Chandra X-ray Observatory on April 10, 2002, detected two possible quark stars, designated RX J1856.5−3754 and 3C 58, which had previously been thought to be neutron stars. Based on the known laws of physics, the former appeared much smaller and the latter much colder than it should be, suggesting that they are composed of material denser than neutron-degenerate matter. However, these observations are met with skepticism by researchers who say the results were not conclusive; and since the late 2000s, the possibility that RX J1856 is a quark star has been excluded.

Another star, XTE J1739-285, has been observed by a team led by Philip Kaaret of the University of Iowa and reported as a possible quark star candidate.

In 2006, You-Ling Yue et al., from Peking University, suggested that PSR B0943+10 may in fact be a low-mass quark star.

It was reported in 2008 that observations of supernovae SN 2006gy, SN 2005gj and SN 2005ap also suggest the existence of quark stars. It has been suggested that the collapsed core of supernova SN 1987A may be a quark star.

In 2015, Zi-Gao Dai et al. from Nanjing University suggested that Supernova ASASSN-15lh is a newborn strange quark star.

In 2022 it was suggested that GW190425, which likely formed as a merger between two neutron stars giving off gravitational waves in the process, could be a quark star.

== Other hypothesized quark formations ==
Apart from ordinary quark matter and strange quark matter, other types of quark–gluon plasma might hypothetically occur or be formed inside neutron stars and quark stars. This includes the following, some of which have been observed and studied in laboratories:

- Robert L. Jaffe 1977, suggested a four-quark state with strangeness (qsq̅s̅).
- Robert L. Jaffe 1977 suggested the H dibaryon, a six-quark state with equal numbers of up-, down-, and strange quarks (represented as uuddss or udsuds).
- Bound multi-quark systems with heavy quarks (QQq̅q̅).
- In 1987, a pentaquark state was first proposed with a charm anti-quark (qqqsc̅).
- Pentaquark state with an antistrange quark and four light quarks consisting of up- and down-quarks only (qqqqs̅).
- Light pentaquarks are grouped within an antidecuplet, the lightest candidate, Θ^{+}, which can also be described by the diquark model of Robert L. Jaffe and Wilczek (QCD).
- Θ^{++} and antiparticle Θ̅^{−−}.
- Doubly strange pentaquark (ssddu̅), member of the light pentaquark antidecuplet.
- Charmed pentaquark Θ_{c}(3100) (uuddc̅) state was detected by the H1 collaboration.
- Tetraquark particles might form inside neutron stars and under other extreme conditions. In 2008, 2013 and 2014 the tetraquark particle of Z(4430), was discovered and investigated in laboratories on Earth.

== See also ==
- Neutron matter – Type of dense exotic matter in physics
- Planck star – Hypothetical astronomical object
- Quark-nova – Hypothetical explosion of a neutron star
- Tolman–Oppenheimer–Volkoff limit – Upper bound to the mass of cold, nonrotating neutron stars
- Degenerate matter – Type of dense exotic matter in physics
  - Preon matter – Hypothetical subatomic particle
  - QCD matter – Hypothetical phases of matter
  - Strangelet – Type of hypothetical particle
  - Magnetar – Type of neutron star with a strong magnetic field
  - White dwarf – Stellar core remnant
