= Black Sun =

Black Sun may refer to:

== Film and television ==
- Black Sun (1964 film), a Japanese film directed by Koreyoshi Kurahara
- Black Sun (1966 film), a French-Italian film directed by Denys de La Patellière
- Black Sun (2005 film), documentary directed by Gary Tarn
- Black Sun (2007 film), directed by Krzysztof Zanussi and starring Valeria Golino
- Black Sun: The Nanking Massacre, 1995 film
- "Black Sun" (Space: 1999), an episode of Space: 1999
- Balkan Shadows, also known as Black Sun, TV series produced by Dragan Bjelogrlić
- Kamen Rider Black Sun, 2022 reboot of the 1987 series Kamen Rider Black

== Literature ==
- Black Sun (Abbey novel), a 1971 novel by Edward Abbey
- Black Sun, a 1974 short story by Dennis Etchison
- Black Sun (Kristeva book), a 1989 book by Julia Kristeva
- Black Sun (Goodrick-Clarke book), a 2002 nonfiction book by Nicholas Goodrick-Clarke
- Black Sun (Twining novel), a 2005 novel by James Twining
- Black Sun (manga), a manga first published in 2007, written and illustrated by Uki Ogasawara
- Black Sun (Roanhorse novel), a 2020 fantasy novel by Rebecca Roanhorse
- Black Sun, a comic series published by Wildstorm
- Black Sun: The Brief Transit and Violent Eclipse of Harry Crosby, a 1976 book by Geoffrey Wolff
- Black Sun Press
- The Black Sun, a 1966 novel by Lance Horner and Kyle Onstott
- The Black Sun, a 1997 novel by Jack Williamson
- The Black Sun: The Alchemy and Art of Darkness, a 2005 book by Stanton Marlan

== Music ==
- Black Sun Ensemble
- Black Sun Empire, a Dutch drum and bass group

=== Albums ===
- Black Sun (Kode9 & the Spaceape album)
- Black Sun (Leessang album)
- Black Sun (Primal Fear album)
- Black Sun (Ra album)
- Black Sun, a 2011 EP by Natalie McCool

=== Songs ===
- "Black Sun", by Dead Can Dance from Aion, 1990
- "Black Sun", by the Cult from The Cult, 1994
- "Black Sun", by Therion from Vovin, 1998
- "Black Sun", by NON from Children of the Black Sun, 2002
- "Black Sun", by Darkest Hour from The Eternal Return, 2009
- "Black Sun" (Death Cab for Cutie song), from Kintsugi, 2015
- "A Black Sun", by Gary Numan from Intruder (Gary Numan album), 2021
- "Black Hole Sun", by Soundgarden from Superunknown, 1994

== Other uses ==
- Black Sun (alchemy), a sun in alchemical and Hermetic traditions
- Black Sun (sculpture), a sculpture by Isamu Noguchi
- Black Sun (symbol), used by neo-Nazis and other far-right groups
- Black Sun (Star Wars), a crime syndicate in the Star Wars universe
- Black Sun Lodge, a chartered local body of Ordo Templi Orientis
- Blaxxun or Black Sun, a former virtual reality 3D chat platform
- Cyric or the Black Sun, a god in the Forgotten Realms universe
- Kamen Rider Black (character) or Black Sun
- Black Sun, an object in The City and the Stars
- Black Sun, a virtual nightclub in Snow Crash
- Black Sun, a weapon in Supreme Commander
- Black sun, a solarization effect in photography due to extreme overexposure

== See also ==
- Black Star (disambiguation)
- Black hole (disambiguation)
- Dark Star (disambiguation)
- Dark Sun (disambiguation)
- Schwarze Sonne (disambiguation)
- Solar eclipse, astronomical phenomenon
- Sort Sol (band), a Danish band
- Sort sol (bird flock), a seasonal flocking of birds
