= Collapsar =

Star that has undergone gravitational collapse

Collapsar type based on initial mass and metallicity

A collapsar is a type of black hole formed inside of a massive star that rotates at a sufficient rate to create a disk around the hole. The model for collapsars was originally developed to explain gamma-ray burst events accompanying supernovas, but the model now includes other forms. Type I collapsars form an initial neutron star but fail to go supernovae, and after a one-second delay, collapse into black holes. Type II collapsars explode, but not enough mass is ejected, and the neutron star falls back into a black hole. Type III collapsars collapse directly into massive black holes.

== See also ==
- List of collapsars
- Shell collapsar
- Gamma-ray burst
- Compact star
