= Compact object =

Classification in astronomy

In astronomy, the term compact object (or compact star) refers collectively to white dwarfs, neutron stars, and black holes. It could also include exotic stars if such hypothetical, dense bodies are confirmed to exist. All compact objects have a high mass relative to their radius, giving them a very high density compared to ordinary atomic matter. The term is used as a generalization for cases where the exact nature of a significant gravitational effect isolated to a small radius is not known.

Since most compact object types represent endpoints of stellar evolution, they are also called stellar remnants, and accordingly may be called dead stars in popular media reports. The state and type of a stellar remnant depends primarily on the mass of its progenitor star. A compact object that is not a black hole may be called a degenerate star.

In June 2020, astronomers reported narrowing down the source of fast radio bursts (FRBs), which may now plausibly include "compact-object mergers and magnetars arising from normal core collapse supernovae".

== Formation ==
The usual endpoint of stellar evolution is the formation of a compact star. Every active star will eventually evolve to a point where the outward radiation pressure from nuclear fusion in its interior can no longer counteract its own gravity. When this happens, the star collapses under its own weight and undergoes the process of stellar death. For most stars, this will result in the formation of a very dense and compact stellar remnant, also known as a compact star.

Compact objects have no internal energy production, but will—with the exception of black holes—usually radiate for millions of years with excess heat left from the collapse itself.

According to the most recent understanding, compact stars could also form during the phase separations of the early Universe following the Big Bang. Primordial origins of known compact objects have not been determined with certainty.

== Lifetime ==
Although compact objects may radiate, and thus cool off and lose energy, they do not depend on high temperatures to maintain their structure, as ordinary stars do. Barring external disturbances and proton decay, they can persist virtually forever. Black holes are however generally believed to finally evaporate from Hawking radiation after trillions of years. According to our current standard models of physical cosmology, all stars will eventually evolve into cool and dark compact stars, by the time the Universe enters the so-called degenerate era in a very distant future.

A somewhat wider definition of compact objects may include smaller solid objects such as planets, asteroids, and comets, but such usage is less common. There are a remarkable variety of stars and other clumps of hot matter, but all matter in the Universe must eventually end as dispersed cold particles or some form of compact stellar or substellar object, according to thermodynamics.

== White dwarfs ==
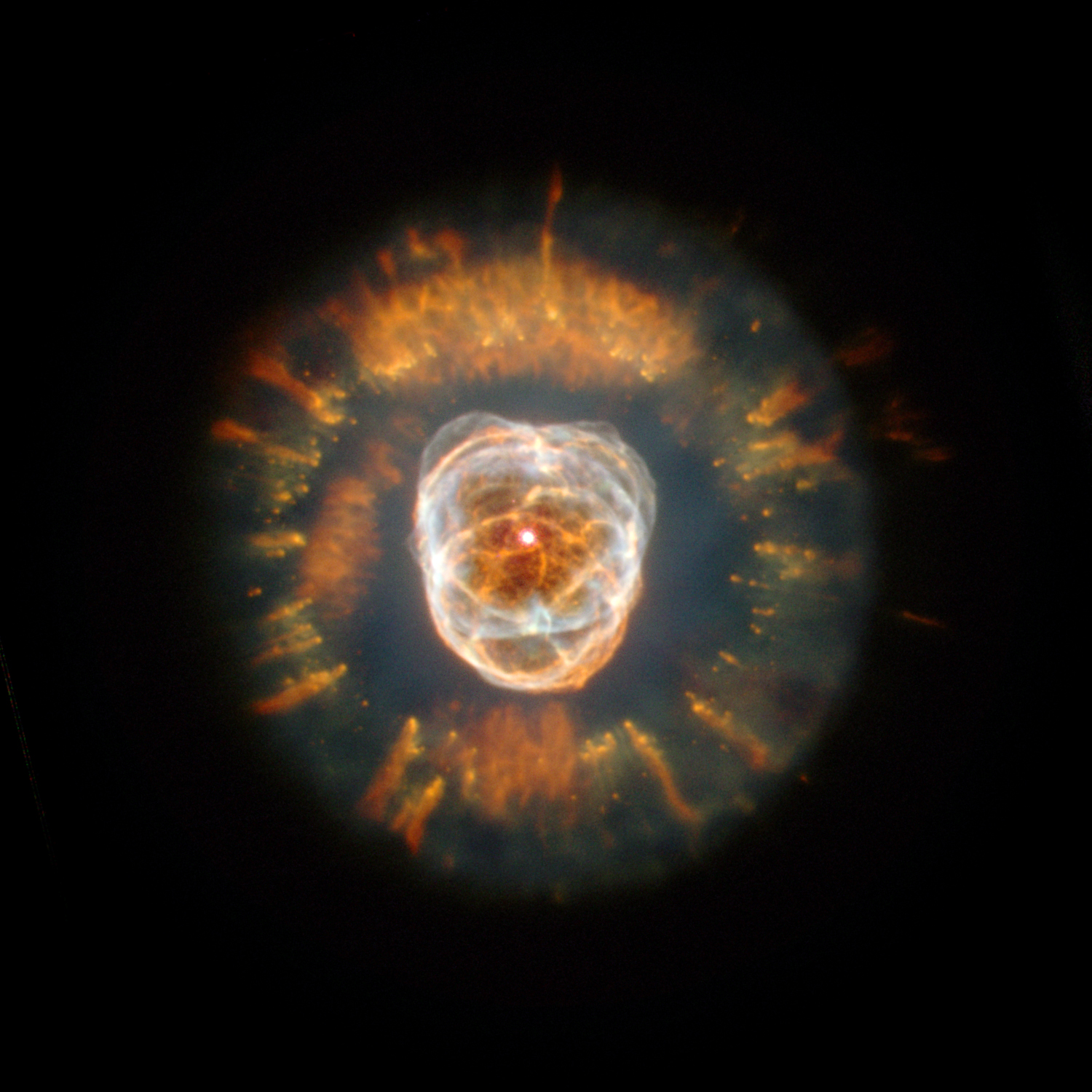
The Eskimo Nebula is illuminated by a white dwarf at its center.

The stars called white or degenerate dwarfs are made up mainly of degenerate matter; typically carbon and oxygen nuclei in a sea of degenerate electrons. White dwarfs arise from the cores of main-sequence stars and are therefore very hot when they are formed. As they cool they will redden and dim until they eventually become dark black dwarfs. White dwarfs were observed in the 19th century, but the extremely high densities and pressures they contain were not explained until the 1920s.

The equation of state for degenerate matter is "soft", meaning that adding more mass will result in a smaller object. Continuing to add mass to what begins as a white dwarf, the object shrinks and the central density becomes even greater, with higher degenerate-electron energies. After the degenerate star's mass has grown sufficiently that its radius has shrunk to only a few thousand kilometers, the mass will be approaching the Chandrasekhar limit – the theoretical upper limit of the mass of a white dwarf, about 1.4 times the mass of the Sun (M_{☉}).

If matter were removed from the center of a white dwarf and slowly compressed, electrons would first be forced to combine with nuclei, changing their protons to neutrons by inverse beta decay. The equilibrium would shift towards heavier, neutron-richer nuclei that are not stable at everyday densities. As the density increases, these nuclei become still larger and less well-bound. At a critical density of about 4×10^{14} kg/m^{3} – called the neutron drip line – the atomic nucleus would tend to dissolve into unbound protons and neutrons. If further compressed, eventually it would reach a point where the matter is on the order of the density of an atomic nucleus – about 2×10^{17} kg/m^{3}. At that density the matter would be chiefly free neutrons, with a light scattering of protons and electrons.

== Neutron stars ==
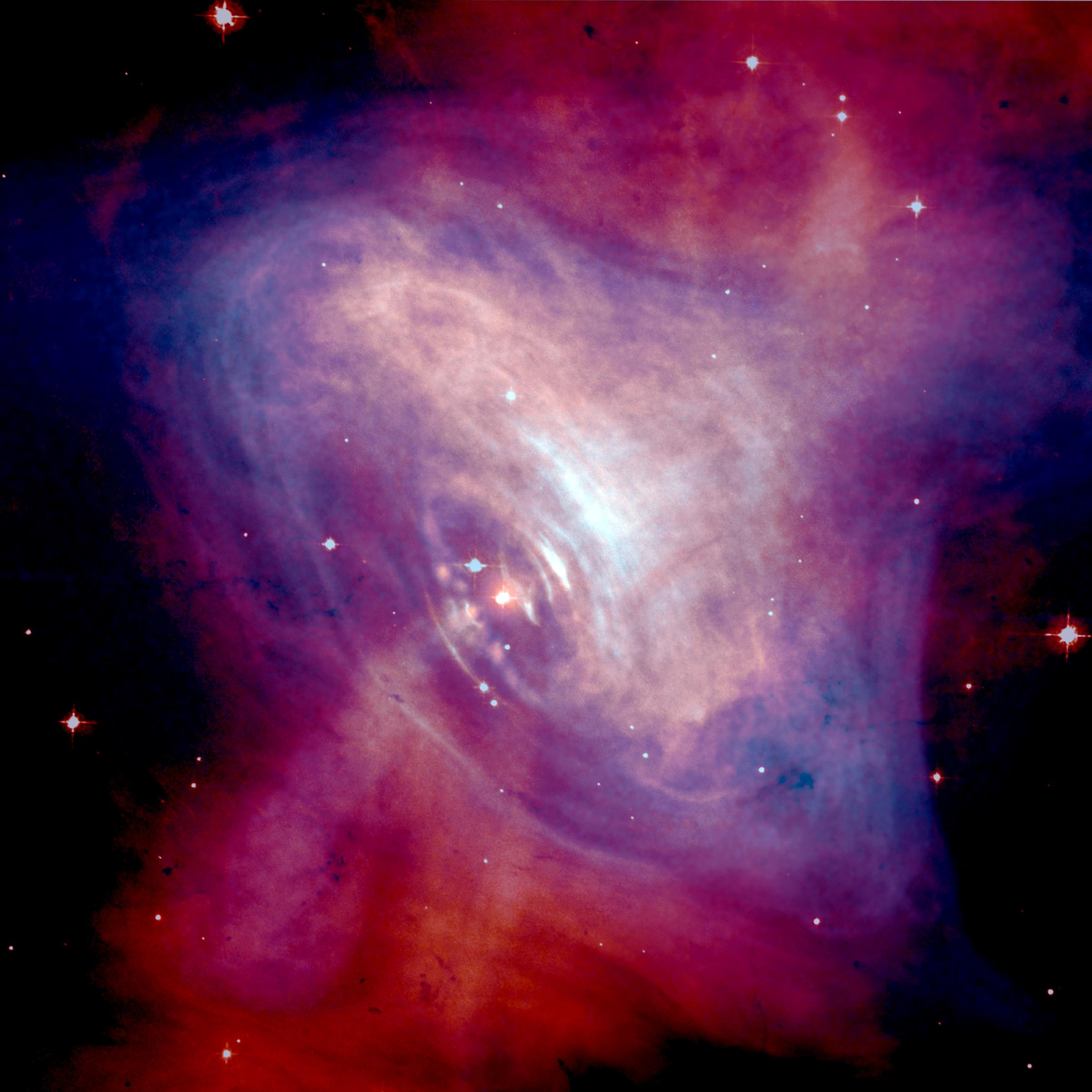
The Crab Nebula is a supernova remnant containing the Crab Pulsar, a neutron star.

In certain binary stars containing a white dwarf, mass is transferred from the companion star onto the white dwarf, eventually pushing it over the Chandrasekhar limit. Electrons react with protons to form neutrons and thus no longer supply the necessary pressure to resist gravity, causing the star to collapse. If the center of the star is composed mostly of carbon and oxygen then such a gravitational collapse will ignite runaway fusion of the carbon and oxygen, resulting in a Type Ia supernova that entirely blows apart the star before the collapse can become irreversible. If the center is composed mostly of magnesium or heavier elements, the collapse continues. As the density further increases, the remaining electrons react with the protons to form more neutrons. The collapse continues until (at higher density) the neutrons become degenerate. A new equilibrium is possible after the star shrinks by three orders of magnitude, to a radius between 10 and 20 km. This is a neutron star.

Although the first neutron star was not observed until 1967 when the first radio pulsar was discovered, neutron stars were proposed by Baade and Zwicky in 1933, only one year after the neutron was discovered in 1932. They realized that because neutron stars are so dense, the collapse of an ordinary star to a neutron star would liberate a large amount of gravitational potential energy, providing a possible explanation for supernovae. This is the explanation for supernovae of types Ib, Ic, and II. Such supernovae occur when the iron core of a massive star exceeds the Chandrasekhar limit and collapses to a neutron star.

Like electrons, neutrons are fermions. They therefore provide neutron degeneracy pressure to support a neutron star against collapse. In addition, repulsive neutron-neutron interactions provide additional pressure. Like the Chandrasekhar limit for white dwarfs, there is a limiting mass for neutron stars: the Tolman–Oppenheimer–Volkoff limit, where these forces are no longer sufficient to hold up the star. As the forces in dense hadronic matter are not well understood, this limit is not known exactly but is thought to be between 2 and 3 M_{☉}. If more mass accretes onto a neutron star, eventually this mass limit will be reached. What happens next is not completely clear.

== Black holes ==
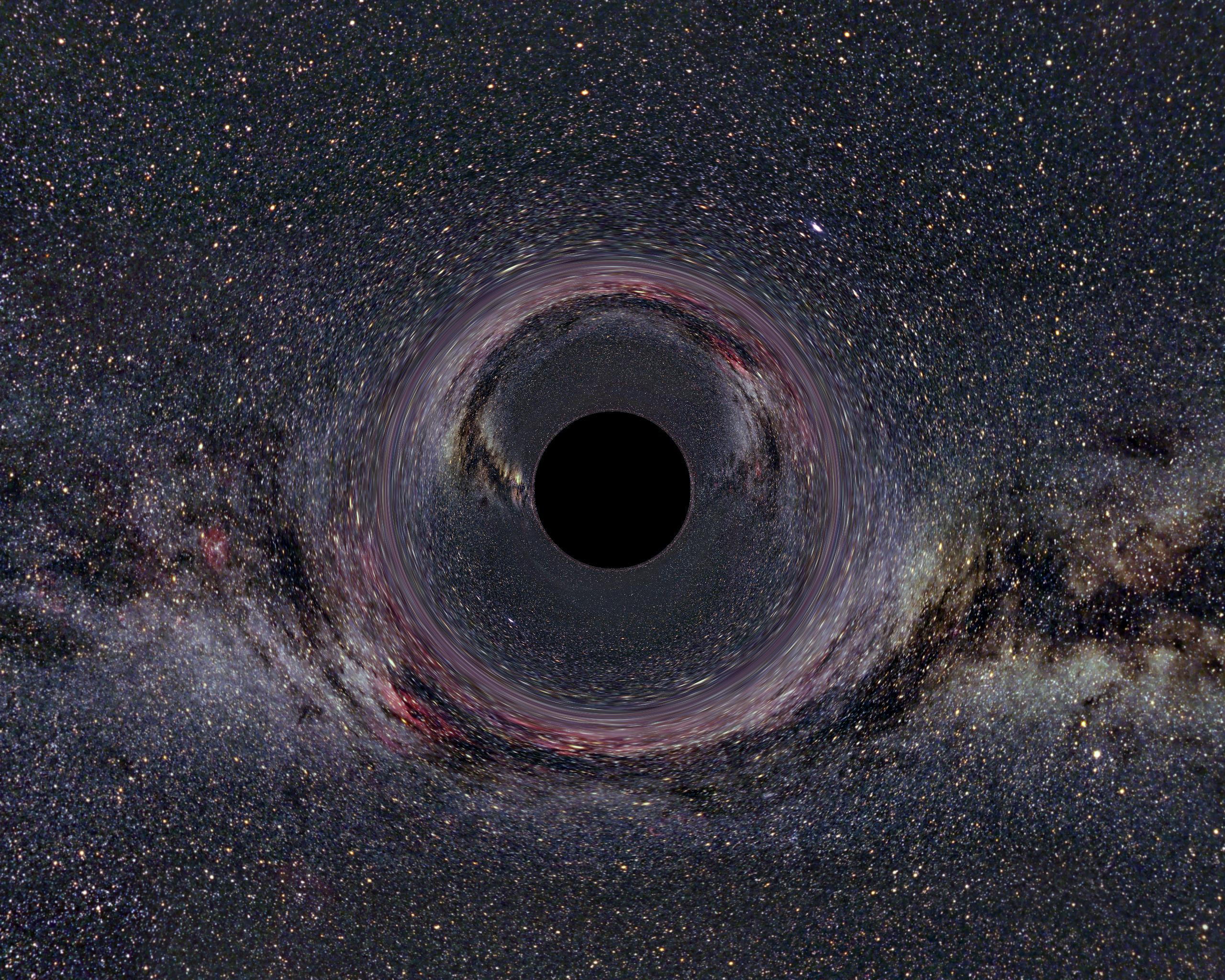
A simulated black hole of ten solar masses, at a distance of 600 km

As more mass is accumulated, equilibrium against gravitational collapse exceeds its breaking point. Once the star's pressure is insufficient to counterbalance gravity, a catastrophic gravitational collapse occurs within milliseconds. The escape velocity at the surface, already at least 1/3 light speed, quickly reaches the velocity of light. At that point no energy or matter can escape and a black hole has formed. Because all light and matter is trapped within an event horizon, a black hole appears truly black, except for the possibility of very faint Hawking radiation. It is presumed that the collapse will continue inside the event horizon.

In the classical theory of general relativity, a gravitational singularity occupying no more than a point will form. There may be a new halt of the catastrophic gravitational collapse at a size comparable to the Planck length, but at these lengths there is no known theory of gravity to predict what will happen. Adding any extra mass to the black hole will cause the radius of the event horizon to increase linearly with the mass of the central singularity. This will induce certain changes in the properties of the black hole, such as reducing the tidal stress near the event horizon, and reducing the gravitational field strength at the horizon. However, there will not be any further qualitative changes in the structure associated with any mass increase.

=== Alternative black hole models ===
- Fuzzball
- Gravastar
- Dark-energy star
- Black star
- Magnetospheric eternally collapsing object
- Dark star
- Primordial black holes

== Exotic stars ==
An exotic star is a hypothetical compact star composed of something other than electrons, protons, and neutrons balanced against gravitational collapse by degeneracy pressure or other quantum properties. These include strange stars (composed of strange matter) and the more speculative preon stars (composed of preons).

Exotic stars are hypothetical, but observations released by the Chandra X-Ray Observatory on April 10, 2002, detected two candidate strange stars, designated RX J1856.5-3754 and 3C58, which had previously been thought to be neutron stars. Based on the known laws of physics, the former appeared much smaller and the latter much colder than they should, suggesting that they are composed of material denser than neutronium. However, these observations are met with skepticism by researchers who say the results were not conclusive.

=== Quark stars and strange stars ===
If neutrons are squeezed enough at a high temperature, they will decompose into their component quarks, forming what is known as quark matter. In this case, the star will shrink further and become denser, but instead of a total collapse into a black hole, it is possible that the star may stabilize itself and survive in this state indefinitely, so long as no more mass is added. It has, to an extent, become a very large nucleon. A star in this hypothetical state is called a "quark star" or more specifically a "strange star", because under sufficiently high pressure it becomes energetically more favorable for one third of the quarks to transform to strange quarks. The pulsar 3C58 has been suggested as a possible quark star. Most neutron stars are thought to hold a core of quark matter but this has proven difficult to determine observationally.

=== Preon stars ===
A preon star is a proposed type of compact star made of preons, a group of hypothetical subatomic particles. Preon stars would be expected to have huge densities, exceeding 10^{23} kilogram per cubic meter – intermediate between quark stars and black holes. Preon stars could originate from supernova explosions or the Big Bang; however, current observations from particle accelerators speak against the existence of preons.

=== Q stars ===
Q stars are hypothetical compact, heavier neutron stars with an exotic state of matter where particle numbers are preserved with radii less than 1.5 times the corresponding Schwarzschild radius. Q stars are also called "gray holes".

=== Electroweak stars ===
An electroweak star is a theoretical type of exotic star, whereby the gravitational collapse of the star is prevented by radiation pressure resulting from electroweak burning, that is, the energy released by conversion of quarks to leptons through the electroweak force. This process occurs in a volume at the star's core approximately the size of an apple, containing about two Earth masses.

=== Boson star ===
A boson star is a hypothetical astronomical object that is formed out of particles called bosons (conventional stars are formed out of fermions). For this type of star to exist, there must be a stable type of boson with repulsive self-interaction. As of 2016 there is no significant evidence that such a star exists. However, it may become possible to detect them by the gravitational radiation emitted by a pair of co-orbiting boson stars.

== Compact relativistic objects and the generalized uncertainty principle ==
Based on the generalized uncertainty principle (GUP), proposed by some approaches to quantum gravity such as string theory and doubly special relativity, the effect of GUP on the thermodynamic properties of compact stars with two different components has been studied recently. Tawfik et al. noted that the existence of quantum gravity correction tends to resist the collapse of stars if the GUP parameter is taking values between Planck scale and electroweak scale. Comparing with other approaches, it was found that the radii of compact stars should be smaller and increasing energy decreases the radii of the compact stars.

== See also ==
- Galaxy formation and evolution

== Sources ==
- Blaschke, D.; Fredriksson, S.; Grigorian, H.; Öztaş, A.; Sandin, F. (2005). "Phase diagram of three-flavor quark matter under compact star constraints". Physical Review D. 72 (6) 065020. arXiv:hep-ph/0503194. Bibcode:2005PhRvD..72f5020B. doi:10.1103/PhysRevD.72.065020. S2CID 119356279.
- Sandin, F. (2005). "Compact stars in the standard model – and beyond". European Physical Journal C. 40 (2): 15–22. arXiv:astro-ph/0410407. Bibcode:2005EPJC...40...15S. doi:10.1140/epjcd/s2005-03-003-y. S2CID 119495444.
- Sandin, F. (2005). Exotic Phases of Matter in Compact Stars (PDF) (Thesis). Luleå University of Technology.
