= Black Star =

Black Star or Blackstar may refer to:

== Astronomy ==
- Black star (semiclassical gravity), a theoretical star built using semiclassical gravity as an alternative to a black hole
- Saturn, referred to as "Black Star" in ancient Judaeic belief
- Black dwarf, a theoretical stellar remnant formed after cooling of a white dwarf to a sufficient level where heat is no longer emitted

== Literature ==
- Blackstar (novel), a 2013 novel by Josh Viola
- Black Star (comics), a 2026 comic book miniseries
- Black Star, a 2018 novel by the Canadian author Maureen Medved
- Blackstar, a character from Erin Hunter's Warriors series
- The Black Star, a fantasy novel by Lin Carter
- Black Star, a character in pulp fiction written by Johnston McCulley

== Companies and brands ==
- Black Star (cider), a brand of cider produced by Brookfield Drinks
- Black Star (fragrance), a perfume by Avril Lavigne
- Black Star (photo agency), a New York-based photo agency founded in 1935
- Black Star Canyon, an area in Orange County California
- Black Star Line, a shipping line created by Marcus Garvey to repatriate African-Americans to Africa
- Black Sex Link, or Black Star, a breed of chicken
- Williams & Guion Black Star Line, a 19th Century sailing packet line

== Film and television ==
- The Black Star (film), a 1922 German silent film
- Blackstar (Arrow), a character in the series Arrow
- Blackstar (TV series), a 1981 fantasy/science fiction cartoon by Filmation
- Black Star (Soul Eater), a ninja assassin character in Soul Eater media
- Black Stars, a set of characters from Sgt. Frog
- Black Star, working title of the 1960 western Flaming Star
- "Black Star", an episode of the series Space: 1999

== Military ==
- Blackstar (spacecraft), a rumored United States Air Force spaceplane
- Black Star, or Type 54 pistol, Chinese pistols

== Music ==
- Black Star (record label), a Russian record label
- Blackstar Amplification, a UK-based manufacturer of guitar amplification and effects pedals

=== Bands ===
- Black Star (rap duo), a hip hop group formed by rappers Yasiin Bey and Talib Kweli
- Blackstar (band), a heavy metal band formed by former members of Carcass
- Black Star, later named Motör Militia, a Bahraini thrash metal band
- One of the aliases of jungle producer Rebel MC

=== Albums ===
- Blackstar (album), a 2016 album by David Bowie
- Black Stars (album), a 2001 album by Jason Moran
- Mos Def & Talib Kweli Are Black Star, a 1998 album by Black Star
- Black Star (Amaarae album), 2025
- Blackstar, a 2003 album by Yahzarah
- Black Star, a 2006 album by Timati

=== Songs ===
- "Blackstar" (song), a 2015 song by David Bowie
- "Black Stars" (song), a 2026 song by the Smashing Pumpkins
- "Black Star", a song by Elvis Presley from sessions for the film Flaming Star
- "Black Star", a 1980 song by Touch (1980s band)
- "Black Star", a 1984 track by Yngwie Malmsteen from Rising Force
- "Blackstar", a 1985 song by Georgie Davis
- "Black Star", a 1995 song by Radiohead from The Bends
- "Black Star", a 1996 song by Carcass from Swansong
- "Black Star", a 1996 song by Lustmord from Strange Attractor/Black Star
- "Blackstar", a 2003 song by Yahzarah from Blackstar
- "Black Star", a 2004 song by Peccatum from Lost in Reverie
- "Black Star", a 2011 song by Avril Lavigne from Goodbye Lullaby
- "BlackStar", a 2012 song by Carlos Jean
- "Blackstar", a 2012 song by Celldweller from Wish Upon a Blackstar
- "Black Star", a 2017 song by The Faceless from In Becoming a Ghost
- "Black Star", a 2018 song by Nick Shoulders from Lonely Like Me
- "Black Star", a 2024 song by Static-X from Project Regeneration Vol. 2

== Sports ==
- Black Stars Basel, a football team based in Basel, Switzerland
- Ghana national football team, nicknamed "Black Stars"

== Other uses ==
- Black Star of Africa, symbol of Africa or Ghana
- Black Star (anarchist group), a Greek direct action group, also known as Mavro Asteri
- Black Star sapphire, a gem

== See also ==
- Black Sun (disambiguation)
- Black hole
- Dark Star (disambiguation)
- Dark Sun (disambiguation)
- Blaqstarr (born 1985), American rapper, producer and DJ
- Star Black, poet, photographer and artist
