= Star Without Light =

Star Without Light may refer to:

- Star Without Light (1946 film), a French drama film
- Star Without Light (1953 film), a Mexican drama film

== See also ==
- Dark Star (disambiguation)
- Black Star (disambiguation)
