= Necromance =

German band

- Also known as: Secret Attack (1987-1989)
- Origin: Spremberg, Brandenburg, Germany
- Genres: Gothic metal Industrial metal Death metal (early); Christian metal
- Years active: 1987–2002
- Labels: Pleitegeier Records; Morbid Records
- Members: Runhardt Scheffler; Raphaela Poltermann; René Schwulera; Jean Schulze
- Past members: Mike Winkler; Sandra Bogdan; Mike Petrick; Mario Eckert
- Website: Necromance on Myspace

Necromance was a Christian gothic metal band from Spremberg, Germany, formed in 1987, disbanded in 2002. Originally signed to Morbid Records as a death metal act and later signed to Pleitegeier Records after changing the music style, the band built a reputation in the underground scenes touring with groups such as Demigod. Necromance released two albums in the 1990s: White Gothic (1997) and Wiederkehr der Schmerzen (1999). Their 2001 album Tribulation Force showcased a strong industrial metal influence. The band has toured Europe, and performed on notable European festivals such as Freakstock in Germany. Their two latest albums were well received by magazines such as Rock Hard and Metal Heart. The band leader Runhardt Scheffler typically writes lyrics about the End Times.

== Biography ==
The band was formed under the name Secret Attack in 1987 and played death metal. In 1989 they changed the name to Necromance, and toured Europe in the early 1990s with Demigod and Lubricant. After recruiting a keyboard player to its line up, the band began playing gothic metal in 1992. Necromance released a split-cd with Enslaved (Ger) in 1991 and the demos Slow Death (1991), The Dwarf (1992), split-cd Zander 1993, and a demo called The Parable of the Weed (1994). In 1993 at one concert, a group of right-wing extremists attacked the band and murdered the band's driver, Mike Zerna. During 1994 two members left Necromance, and the band became Christian. Their line up was: Sandra (vocals, guitar), René (synthesizer), Mike (guitar) Runhardt (vocals, guitar).

Necromance recorded their first album White Gothic in 1997. After the release, they signed a record deal with Pleitegeier Records. In 1999, they released Wiederkehr der Schmerzen on this label. The album incorporated more industrial elements. Later in 2001, these elements became more apparent on their sound when they recorded the album Tribulation Force. For the recording line up, the band was joined by Raphaela Polterman for vocals, and Jean Schulze returned as a drummer. The album was produced by Mozart and Lutz Demmler of the German gothic and industrial metal band Umbra et Imago. The album's production was more expensive than on their previous works, and according to the band, Tribulation Force did not receive any marketing from the label. As a result, Necromance sold all their instruments to cover the costs and disbanded in April 2002.

Since then the band has not released new material. Their website has gone offline but few years ago the band gave their first two albums as free downloads on their site. However, on December 23, 2007 the band launched an official MySpace page.

== Music ==
Necromance's music is said to have strong romantic old school gothic influences that pushes back into the early style of bands such as Bauhaus, London After Midnight and Fields of the Nephilim while also experimenting with abstract, almost industrial sounds implemented in many of their songs. Some of Necromance's songs have elements of their old German death metal roots, notably the rough vocals. Some songs are sung in German, with the majority in English. Necromance's music is guitar driven, and the songs are characterized by minimalistic structures, danceable drums, melancholic atmosphere, and symphonic keyboards. Necromance shares vocal duties between male and female vocalists. Runhardt's vocals are deep, aggressive and raspy. Their lyrics are described as sometimes almost worshipful and typically talk about the End Times based on the Book of Revelation.

== Discography ==
Studio albums

- White Gothic (1997)
- Wiederkehr der Schmerzen (1999)
- Tribulation Force (2001)

Demos

- Slow Death (1991)
- The Dwarf (1992)
- The Parable of the Weed (1994)

Splits

- Enslaved/Necromance (1991)
- Zander (1993)

== Members ==
Last Known Lineup

- Runhardt Scheffler - vocals, guitar (1987-2002)
- Raphaela Poltermann - female vocals (1999-2002)
- René Schwulera - synthesizer (1993-2002)
- Jean Schulze - drums (1987-1994, 1999–2002)

Former members

- Mike Winkler - guitar (1987-1999)
- Sandra Bogdan - female vocals (1987-1999)
- Mike Petrick - vocals, bass
- Mario Eckert - bass
- Madelaine Sheffler - bass
