= Dark Sun (disambiguation) =

Dark Sun is a Dungeons & Dragons campaign setting.

Dark Sun or Dark Suns may also refer to:

== Film ==
- The Dark Sun (Il sole buio), a 1990 Italian film
- Dark Suns (film) (Soleils noirs), a 2018 Canadian documentary film

== Literature ==
- Dark Sun (novella), in the CHERUB series, by Robert Muchamore, 2008
- Dark Sun: The Making of the Hydrogen Bomb, a 1995 book by Richard Rhodes

== Music ==
- Dark Suns, a German band
- Dark Sun (album), by Dayseeker, 2022

== Other uses ==
- Dark Sun (Maya ruler), fl. 810

== See also ==
- Dark Star (disambiguation)
- Black Sun (disambiguation)
- Black Star (disambiguation)
- The Dark Side of the Sun (disambiguation)
- Solar eclipse, when the Moon passes between Earth and the Sun
- Dark the Suns, a Finnish metal band
