= Schwarze Sonne =

Schwarze Sonne may refer to:

- Black Sun (symbol), a neo-Nazi symbol
- Schwarze Sonne, a 1998 film and a 1999 book by Rüdiger Sünner
- Die Schwarze Sonne, a 1921 play by Friedrich Wolf
- Die Schwarze Sonne, a 1933 book by Ehm Welk
- Die Schwarze Sonne, a 1968 film by Falk Harnack
- "Schwarze Sonne", a 2001 song by Necromante from the album Tribulation Force
- "Schwarze Sonne", a 2003 song by E Nomine from the album Die Prophezeiung
- "Schwarze Sonne", a 2012 song by Lights of Euphoria
- "Die Schwarze Sonne", a 2013 song by RAF Camora
- Schwarze Sonne, a fictional Nazi moonbase in the film Iron Sky

== See also ==
- Black Sun (disambiguation)
