= Dark Star =

Dark Star or Darkstar may refer to:

== Astronomy ==
- Dark star (Newtonian mechanics), a star that has a gravitational pull strong enough to trap light under Newtonian gravity
- Dark star (dark matter), a star heated by annihilation of dark matter particles within it
- Dark-energy star, an object composed of dark energy that outwardly resembles a black hole
- Black dwarf

== Arts, entertainment and media ==
=== Fictional entities ===
- Darkstar (Marvel Comics), a comic book superhero
- Darkstars, a DC Comics superhero team
- Darkstar Comics, a fictional comic book company in the TV series Spaced
- "Darkstar", a fictional military aircraft in the 2022 film Top Gun: Maverick
- Darkstar (Ben 10), or Michael Morningstar, a character in the Ben 10 franchise
- Dark Star (No More Heroes), a video game character
- Dark Star, a malevolent artifact in the video game Mario & Luigi: Bowser's Inside Story
- Darkstar, a special weapon in the Sci-Fi MMOFPS PlanetSide 2

=== Film and television ===
- The Dark Star (1919 film), a lost 1919 silent film
- The Dark Star (1955 film), a 1955 West German drama film
- Dark Star (film), a 1974 science fiction comedy film
- Dark Star, a 1978 film distributed by David Grant
- Dark Star: H. R. Giger's World, a 2014 Swiss documentary

=== Gaming ===
- DarkStar One, a 2006 video game
- Darkstar: The Interactive Movie, a 2010 video game
- Dark Star (1984 video game), for the ZX Spectrum

=== Literature ===
- Dark Star, an issue of the comics series The Transformers
- The Dark Star, a 1917 novel by Robert W. Chambers
- Dark Star, a 1929 novel by Lorna Moon
- The Dark Star, a 1939 novel by Margaret Mackie Morrison, writing as March Cost
- Dark Star, a 1969 novel by Norma K. Hemming, writing as Nerina Hilliard
- Dark Star, a novelization of the 1974 film, by Alan Dean Foster
- Dark Star, a 1985 biography about John Gilbert written by his daughter Leatrice Joy-Gilbert
- Dark Star, a 1989 novel by Marcia Muller
- Dark Star: The Roy Orbison Story, a 1990 book by Ellis Amburn
- Dark Star, a 1991 Night Soldiers novel by Alan Furst
- Dark Star, a 2008 Stony Man novel by Nick Pollotta, writing as Don Pendleton
- Darkstar, a 2011 novella by Christopher R. Howard
- Dark Star, a 2020 book by Jane Holland, an omnibus of the Stella Penhaligon series

=== Music ===
==== Performers ====
- Dark Star (band), an English psychedelic rock band, 1998–2001
- Darkstar (band), an English electronic duo, formed 2007
- Dark Star Orchestra, a Grateful Dead tribute band
- Darkstar, a progressive metal band co-founded by Dan Rock of Psychotic Waltz

==== Albums ====
- Dark Star (soundtrack), by John Carpenter, 1980
- Dark Star, by Deine Lakaien, 1991
- Dark Star, by The Supernaturals, 1993
- Dark Star: The Music of the Grateful Dead, by the David Murray Octet, 1996
- Dark Star (album), by the Grateful Dead and featuring their song "Dark Star", 2012
- Dark Star, by Jaymes Young, 2013

==== Songs ====
- "Dark Star" (song), by the Grateful Dead
- "Dark Star", by Beck from The Information
- "Dark Star", by Cinema Bizarre from ToyZ
- "Dark Star", by Crosby, Stills & Nash from CSN
- "Dark Star", by Delerium from Faces, Forms & Illusions
- "Dark Star", by Hypnogaja from Truth Decay
- "Dark Star", by I Am Kloot from Natural History
- "Dark Star", by Mike Oldfield from Tubular Bells II
- "Dark Star", by Poliça from Give You the Ghost
- "Dark Star", by Tarja Turunen from What Lies Beneath
- "Dark Star", by Jaymes Young from his album of the same name

== Technology ==
- Lockheed Martin RQ-3 DarkStar, an unmanned aerial vehicle
- Project Darkstar, a framework for creating massively multiplayer online games
- Tesla Roadster (first generation), codenamed DarkStar, an electric sports car

== Other uses ==
- Dark Star Brewing Company, in West Sussex, England
- Dark Star (cave), a cave system in Uzbekistan
- Dark Star (horse), an American Thoroughbred racehorse

== See also ==
- Black Star (disambiguation)
- Black Sun (disambiguation)
- Dark Sun (disambiguation)
- Dark (disambiguation)
- Star (disambiguation)
