= White Gothic =

Studio album by Necromance
- Released: 1997
- Recorded: 1997
- Genre: Gothic metal
- Length: 52:00
- Label: Independent

Necromance chronology
White Gothic (1997)	Wiederkehr der Schmerzen (1999)

White Gothic is the debut album by the German gothic metal band Necromance released in 1997.

== Recording ==
The album was released on independently in 1997 and the band self-marketed the album to magazines. Afterwards the band signed a record deal with Pleitegeier Records.

Musically, the album's style is gothic metal. The output is characterized by distorted power chord guitars, symphonic keyboards, and steril computer drums. Other characteristical elements are Runhardt Scheffler's rough and half growled vocals, a relic from the band's death metal roots. Some vocals are sung by the female singer-guitarist Sandra. Her mid-range, melancholic voice is a very dominant element on songs such as "Morgenlied in Böser Zeit." The songstructures on the album are somewhat simple, basing more emphasis on dark, introspective, and decadentic atmosphere rather than rich soundscapes or technical playing. Some of the songs such as "Mysterious Night" and "Eternal Glory" contain more traditional guitar playing reminiscent of the early deathrock and gothic rock bands, and cleaner vocals. The production on the album is dry and thin, and the drums and keyboards are more up-front in the mix.

The word "white" in the album title refers to the Christian lyrical themes that collide with gothic dark romantic thematics. The lyrics contain Bible citations on End times on songs such as the outro "Voice in the Wilderness." Two of the album's songs are sung in German.

== Reception ==
Although criticized for production issues, varying song material and sometimes playing out of key, the album received positive reviews from the underground media. For example, the German gothic music and subculture magazine Orkus wrote about the album in its November issue in 1997: "Metallic guitars combined with hypnotic—melancholic—melodic keyboard sounds, a strongly whispering singing and a beautiful female voice to a symbiosis that is not only fun, but also very fresh sounding!" Other zines also gave the album favorable reviews. Refraktor 6 wrote: "Here is now my masterpiece of Necromance... Friends of gothic sounds can access this without hesitation." Different Frequenzies gave it 3 out of 4 and wrote: "Necromance gave me an interesting insight into a religious world and created with White Gothic a very innovative piece of music that music fans should not miss..." Dark Heart wrote in winter 1997/1998: "Every song on the album is a gem in itself, you would not want to miss that if you heard it once... on its CD Necromance establishes their status as gothic - outright cult band."

== Track listing ==
1. "Wait for Me" - 3:47
2. "Morgenlied in Böser Zeit" - 4:54
3. "The Harvest of the Earth" - 3:59
4. "Our Seats Are Empty" - 3:28
5. "Lilies of the Field" - 4:30
6. "Signs of the End of the Age" - 2:04
7. "Mysterious Night" - 3:46
8. "God Is Might" - 4:08
9. "Eternal Glory" - 2:35
10. "Sounds of Brainstorms" - 3:18
11. "Vom Sterben" - 4:27
12. "Waiting for the Lord" - 3:03
13. "Vom Hindern" - 4:04
14. "Voice in the Wilderness" - 4:08

== Personnel ==
- Sandra - vocals, guitar
- René - synthesizer
- Mike - guitar
- Runhardt - vocals, guitar
