= Flock (birds) =

Group of individual birds travelling together

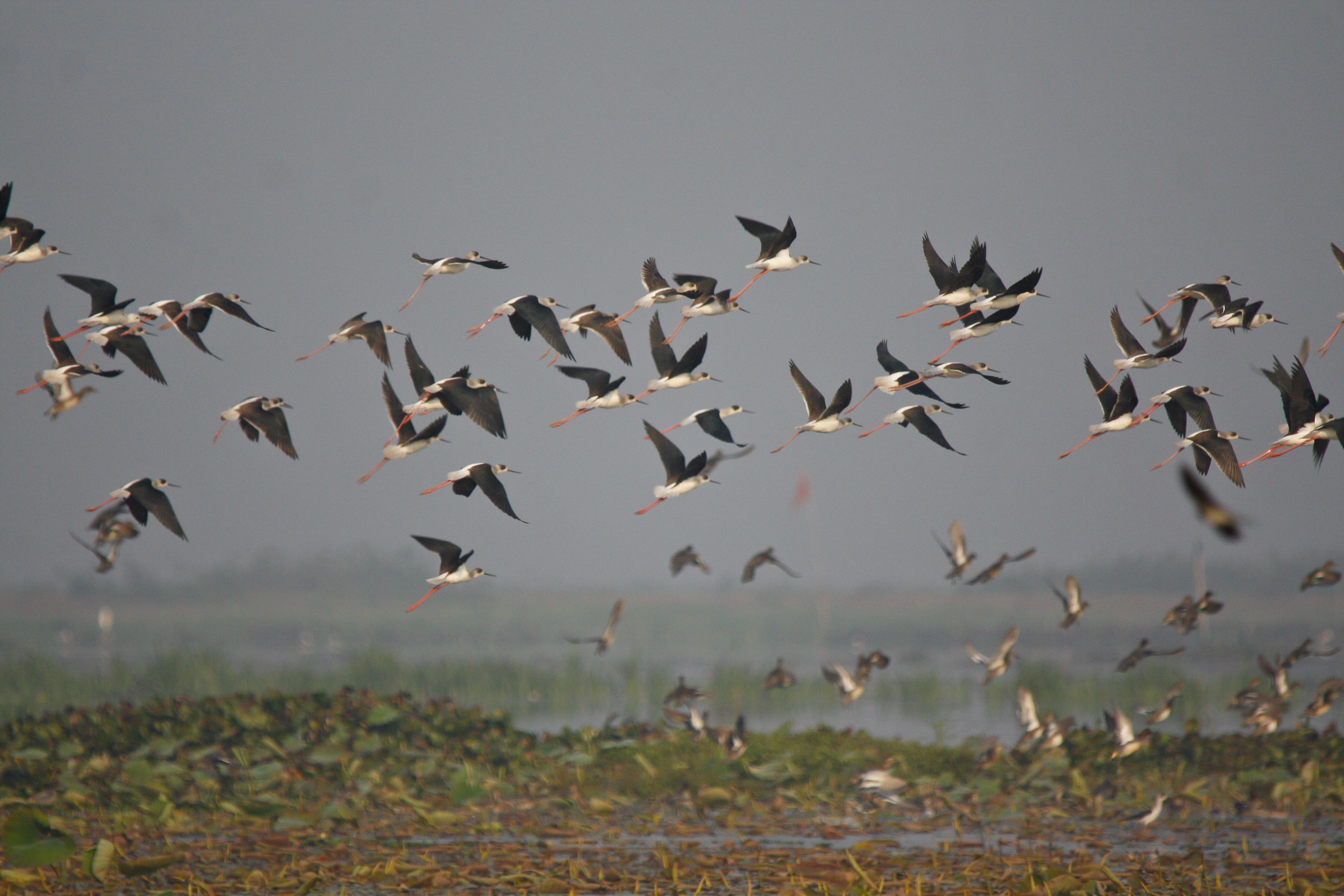
A flock of black-winged stilts in Baikka Beel, Bangladesh

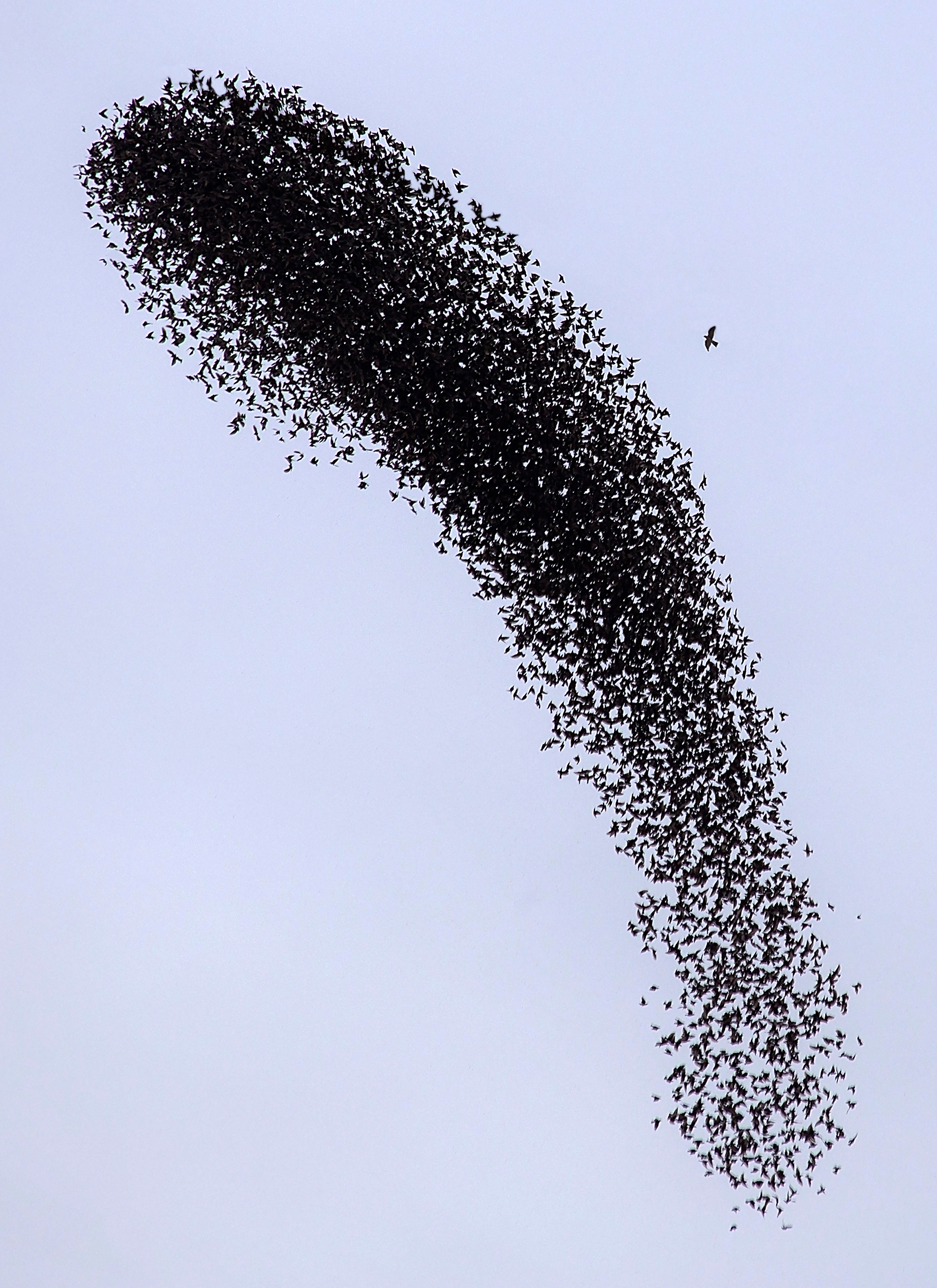
Starlings flocking, a predator bird can be seen upper right

A flock is a gathering of individual birds to forage or travel collectively. Avian flocks are typically associated with migration. Flocking also offers foraging benefits and protection from predators, although flocking can have costs for individual members.

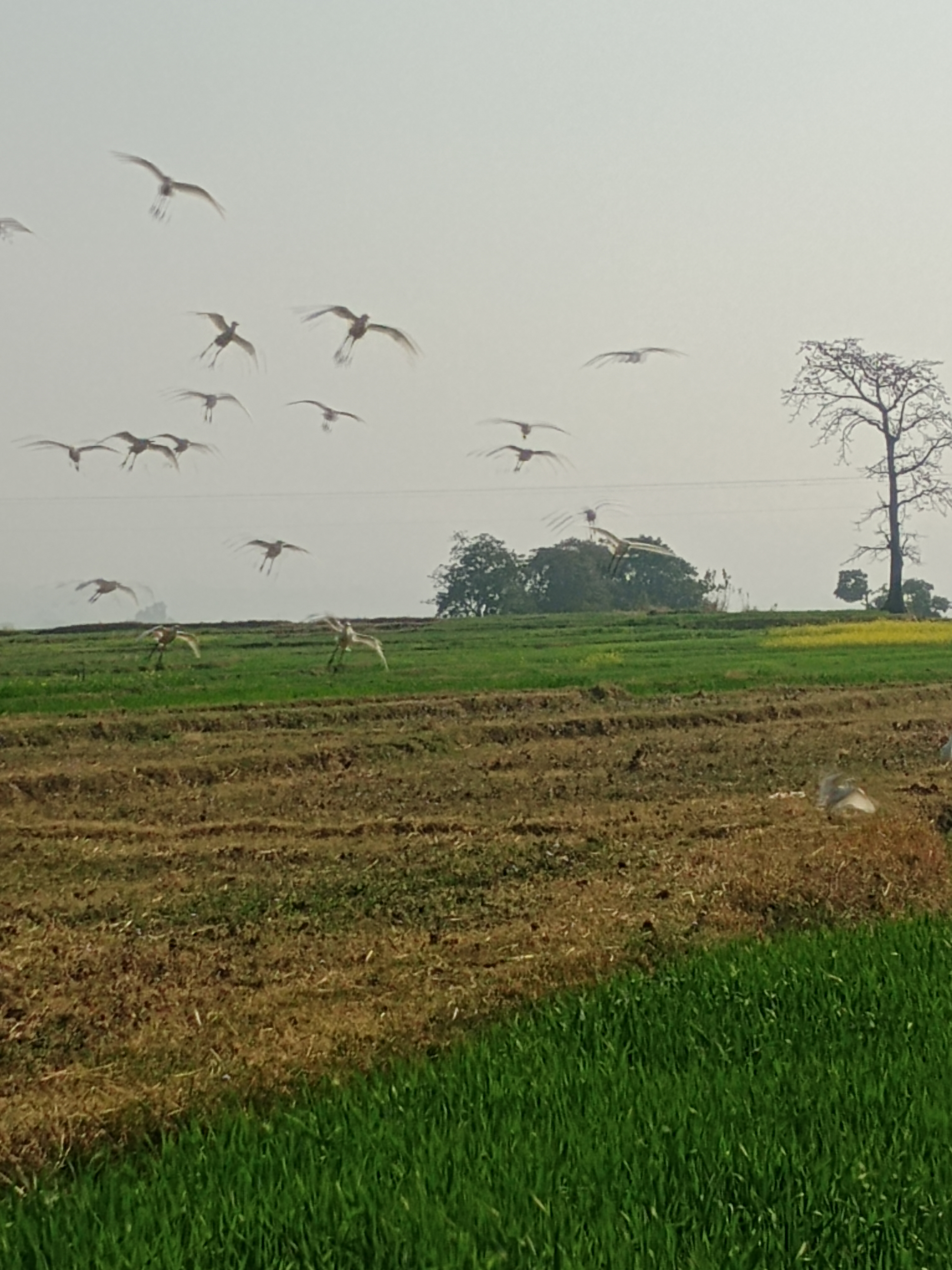
Flock of birds in the field at Kangra (Himachal Pradesh)

Flocks are often defined as groups consisting of individuals from the same species. However, mixed flocks consisting of two or more species are also common. Avian species that tend to flock together are typically similar in taxonomy and share morphological characteristics such as size and shape. Mixed flocks offer increased protection against predators, which is particularly important in closed habitats such as forests where early warning calls play a vital role in early recognition of danger. The result is the formation of many mixed-species feeding flocks.

== Mixed flocks ==
While mixed flocks are typically thought to comprise two different species, it is specifically the two different behaviours of the species that compose a mixed flock. Within a mixed flock there can be two different behavioural characteristics: sally and gleaner. Sallies are individuals that act as guards of the flock and consume prey in the air during flight. On the other hand, gleaners are those that consume prey living within vegetation.

Studies have shown that as resources in the aerial environment increase, the flock will possess more sallies than gleaners. This has been shown to occur during forest fires in which insects have been flushed from vegetation, however this can also be done by the gleaners. When gleaners obtain meals from vegetation it causes the other prey within the vegetation to be flushed out into the aerial environment. It is through this specific behaviour of feeding among vegetation that the gleaners indirectly increase the foraging rate of the sallies.

Those birds that are more rare and therefore less abundant in an environment are more likely to perform in this mixed flock behaviour. Despite the fact that this bird is more likely to be a subordinate, its ability to obtain food increases substantially. As well this bird is now less likely to be attacked by a predator because predators have a lower success rate when attacking large flocks.

== Safety from predation ==
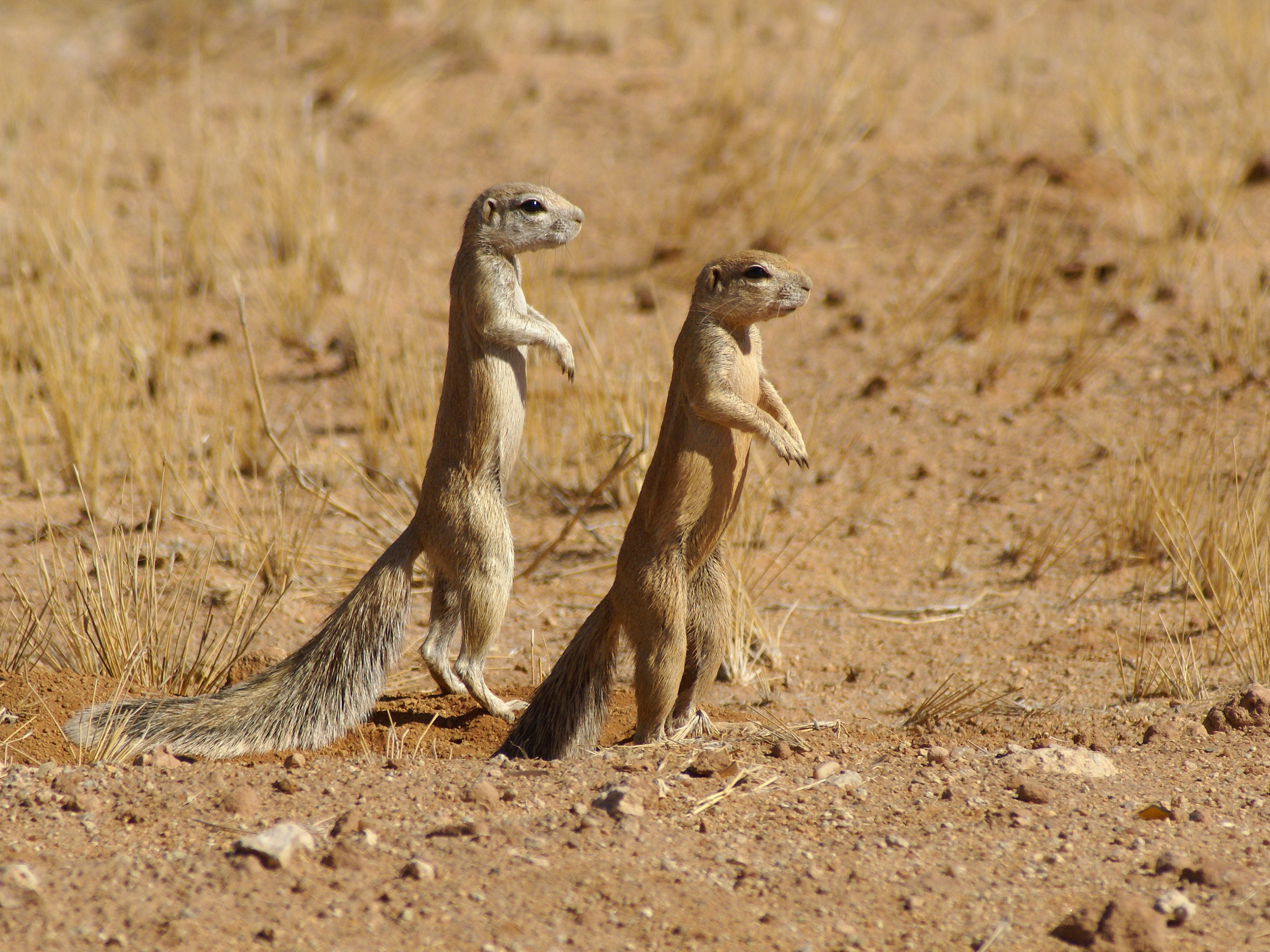
Two Cape ground squirrels in an erect position upon hearing the predation alarm call from conspecifics

The ability to avoid predation is one of the most important skills necessary in order to increase one's fitness. It can be seen that by ground squirrels living in colonies, the ability to recognize a predator is rapid. The squirrel is then able to use vocalizations to warn conspecifics of the possible threat. This simple example demonstrates that flocks are not only seen in bird species or a herd of sheep, but it is also apparent in other animals such as rodents. This alarm call of the ground squirrel requires the ability of the animal to first recognize that there is danger present and then to react. This type of behaviour is also seen in some birds. By making an alarm call to signal members of the flock one is providing the predator with an acoustical cue to the location of a possible prey. The benefit here is if the members of the flock are genetically related to one another. If this is true, even if the bird that signalled the flock were to die its fitness would not decrease according to Hamilton's Rule. However another study involving thick-knees challenged whether or not an animal had to recognize the presence of a predator for protection against it.

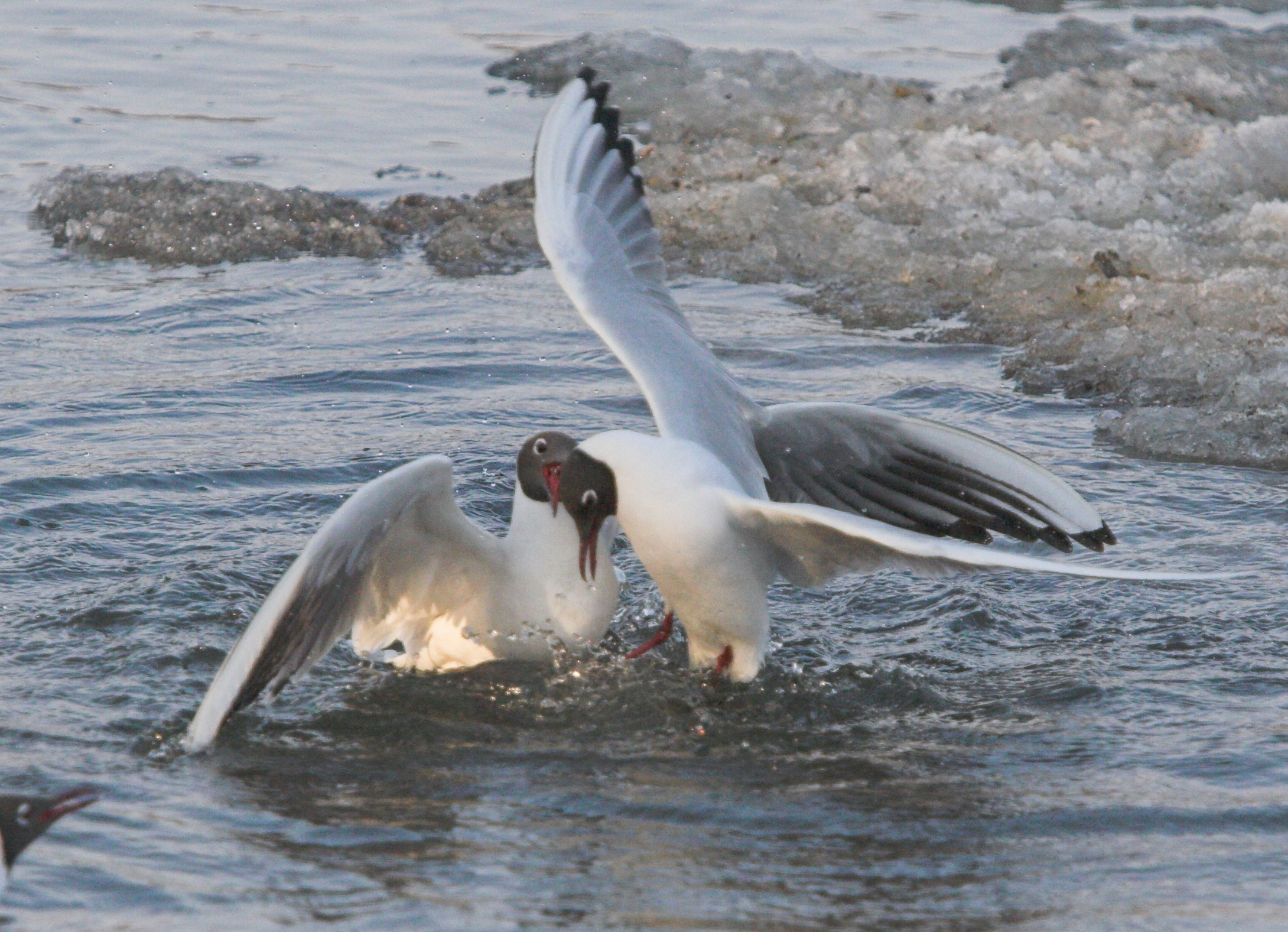
Aggressive display between two black-headed gulls

Thick-knees are birds that are seen in large flocks during particular seasons in various regions of the world. During the nonbreeding season, Peruvian thick-knees in Chile are reported to have an average of 22.5 birds — a mixture of adults and youngsters — in their flocks. Young birds were observed learning anti-predator behaviour strategies from adults during this time. Researchers believe that the flocking behaviour may help to decrease a predator's success rate when attacking the flock, rather than increasing the ability of the flock to spot an approaching predator.

By birds co-existing with one another in a flock, less time and energy is spent searching for predators. This mutual protection of one another within the flock is one of the benefits to living within a group. However, as flock numbers increase the more aggressive individuals within the flock become towards one another. This is one of the costs to living within a flock. It is often seen that flocks are dynamic and thus fluctuate in size depending on the needs of individuals in order the maximize benefits without incurring a large amount of costs.

By living in a large flock, birds can attack the predator with a stronger force compared to if the bird was on its own. Flocks of black-capped chickadees have shown the ability to produce a mobbing call when they visualize a possible predator. In response, the individual black-capped chickadees surround the predator and attack it in a mob-like fashion to force the predator to leave. This is known as mobbing. This mobbing behaviour is quickly learned by the juveniles within a flock meaning that these individuals will be better equipped as adults to ward off predators and respond rapidly when a predator is in sight.

== Foraging in flocks ==
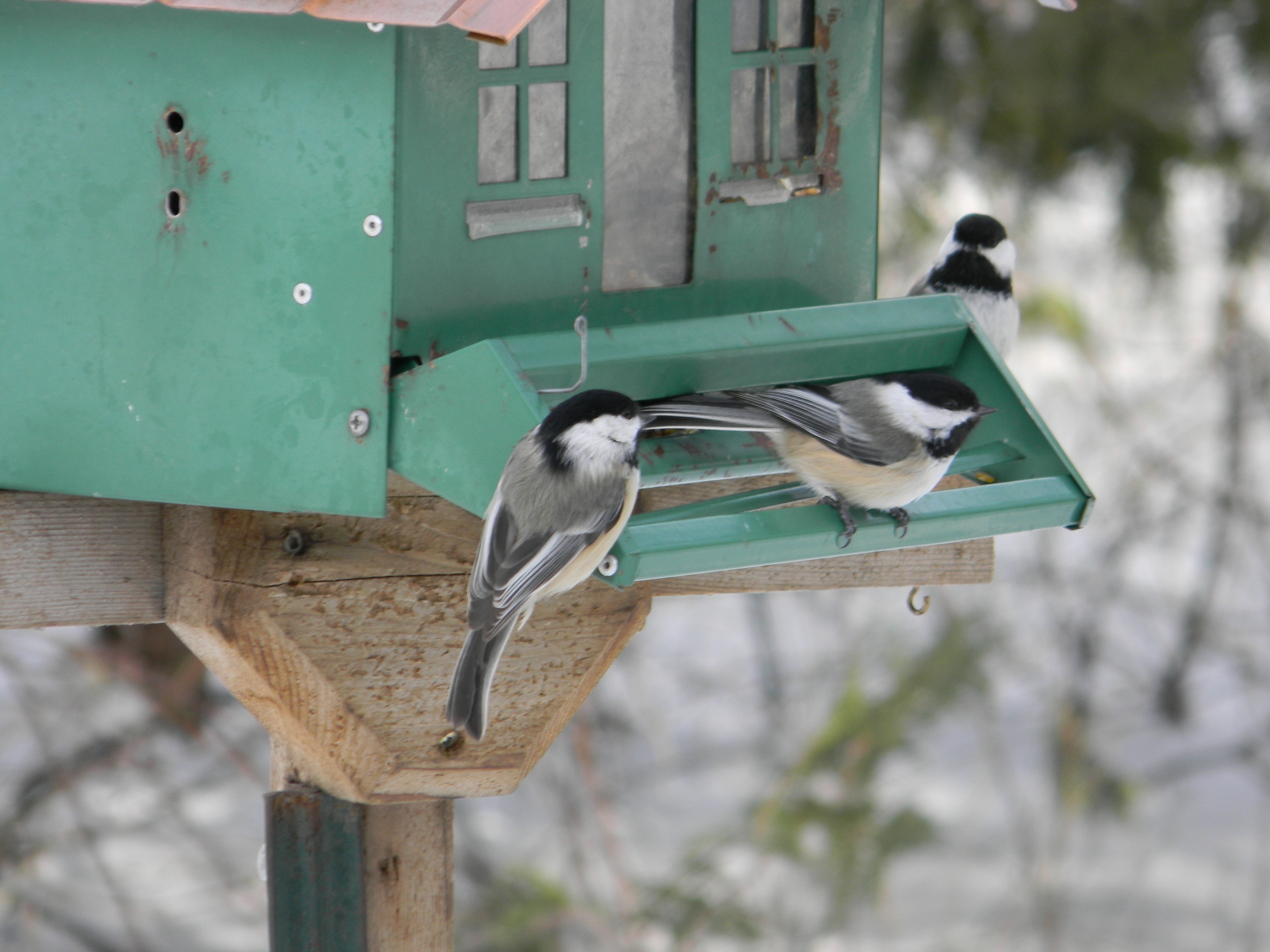
Group of black-capped chickadees feeding at a bird feeder.

Bird species living in a flock may capture prey, likely injured, from an unsuccessful bird within its flock. This behavior is known as the beater effect and is one of the benefits of birds foraging in a flock with other birds.

It can be seen that birds in a flock may perform the information-sharing model. In this situation the entire flock would search for food and the first to find a reliable food source will alert the flock and the entire group may benefit by this finding. While this is an obvious benefit of the information-sharing model, the cost is that the social hierarchy of the flock may result in subordinate birds being denied food by those that are dominant. Another cost is the possibility that some individuals may refuse to contribute in the search of food and instead simply wait for another member to find a food resource. These individuals are known as producers and scroungers, respectively.

An intricate hunting system can be seen in the Harris's hawk in which groups of 2–6 hunt a single prey together. The group splits into smaller groups in which it then encloses on a prey, such as a rabbit, before it attacks it. By hunting as a group the Harris's Hawk can hunt larger animals and decrease the amount of energy spent hunting while each hawk in the group is able to eat from the catch.

== Black sun ==
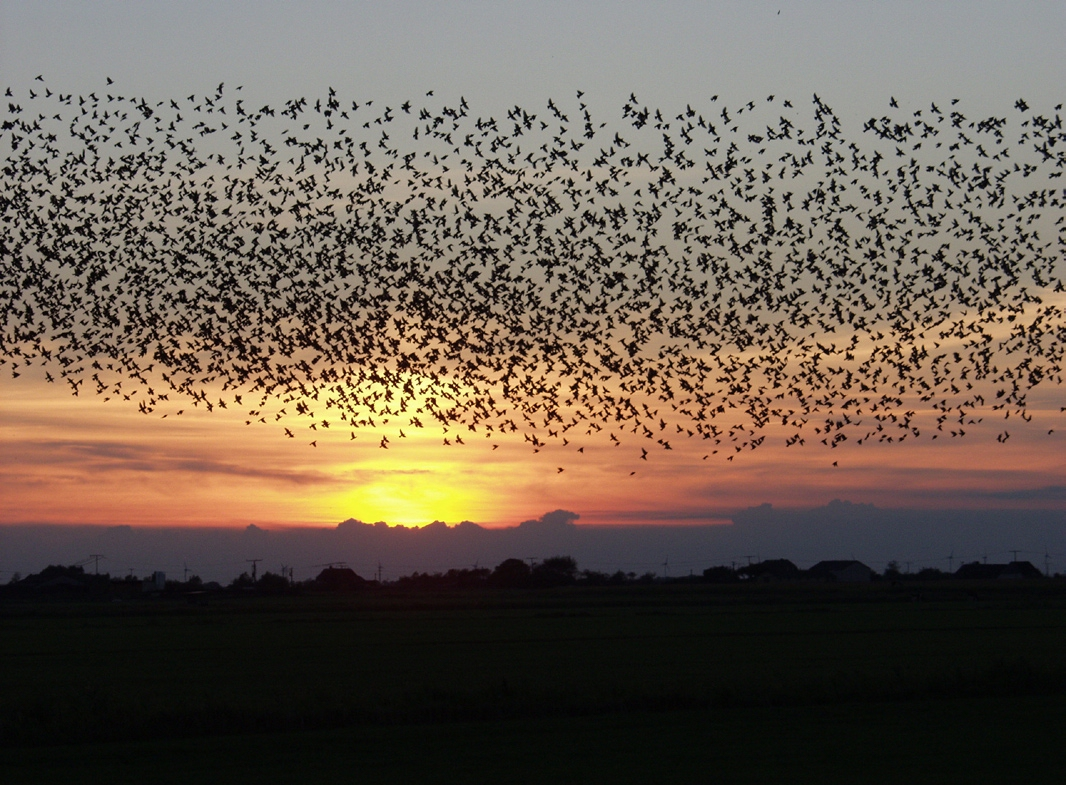
Flock of birds demonstrating the sort sol

In Denmark, there is a biannual phenomenon known as sort sol (Danish for "black sun"). This is when flocks of European starlings gather in vast numbers, creating complex shapes against the sky during the spring. It is during this time spent in Denmark that the European starlings spend time gathering food and resting as part of their migration journey. Collecting in groups this large enables the European starlings to decrease their risk of predation by hawks.
