= Tribulation Force (album) =

Studio album by Necromance
- Released: 2001
- Recorded: 2001
- Genres: Gothic metal Industrial metal Neue Deutsche Härte
- Length: 51:00
- Label: Pleitegeier Records
- Producers: Lutz Demmler and Mozart of Umbra et Imago

Necromance chronology
Wiederkehr der Schmerzen (1999)	Tribulation Force (2001)

Tribulation Force is the third album by the German gothic metal band Necromance, released on Pleitegeier Records in 2001. While considered the band's best effort by many, the album did not receive any advertising, leading to poor sales and forced Necromance to split up.

== Recording ==
Following the release of the previous album, Wiederkehr der Schmerzen, the band parted ways with the guitarist Sandra Bogdan, and Necromance was joined by the female singer Raphaela Poltermann who contributes to the band's sound with her vivid voice. Another member addition was the drummer Jean Schulze, who had previously been in the band years a go when Necromance played death metal and now replaced the drum machine called "Murd Retupmoc." Because of Schulze's addition, it was rumored that the band would return to its death metal roots, which did not happen. Despite having a real drummer, Necromance's drumming approach did not change drastically from the previous simple rhythm patterns and steril sound.

Tribulation Force was produced by Lutz Demler and Mozart of the pioneering German gothic industrial metal and Neue Deutsche Härte group Umbra et Imago. According to Necromance's official MySpace, Tribulation Force was the band's most expensive album to record and produce, and after its release the album did not receive any promotion, marketing or advertising from the record label. Necromance has stated that even their early demos were better known than this album. The band ended up in financial difficulties and sold their equipment and instruments to pay the expenses. As a result, Necromance disbanded in April 2002.

The album saw an improved sound production that many critics called rich and professional. Musically, the album continued mixing gothic metal and industrial music. The title song, "Scharze Sonne," and "The Beast" consist purely of industrial sounds and distorted vocal effects. Both "Eternal Life" and "I Believe" showcase a more future pop or darkwave type influence with Poltermann singing catchy, romantic choruses accompanied by shimmering keyboards. "The Beyond", often considered one of the highlights of the album, was released in 2005 on the Cold Fusion Music's sampler Lunar Eclipse. The opening song "Wohl angetan von dieser Welt" progresses from lone guitar riff to rich gothic metal piece. "He is Risen" consists of dark, doomy organ melodies and horrific, monstrous vocal effects repeating the song title. "Der Schläfer" is a rich, doom metal -esque instrumental with layers of sounds. The closing song, "Under the Sign of the Pyramid," represents a style reminiscent of the Neue Deutsche Härte genre with its militant drum beats accompanied by crunchy riffs and harsh, rough vocals by Runhardt Scheffler. The album's lyrics are inspired by the Book of Revelation.

The album was well received by magazines such as Rock Hard and Metal Heart.

== Track listing ==
1. "Wohl angetan von dieser Welt" - 6:11
2. "Tribulation Force" - 3:51
3. "Eternal Life" - 5:57
4. "Schwarze Sonne" - 4:05
5. "The Beyond" - 4:39
6. "The Beast" - 7:09
7. "He Is Risen" - 5:20
8. "Der Schläfer" - 3:22
9. "I Believe" - 4:10
10. "Under the Sign of the Pyramid" - 5:24

== Personnel ==
- Runhardt Scheffler - vocals, guitar
- Raphaela Poltermann - vocals
- René Schwulera - synthesizer
- Jean Schulze - drums
