= Wiederkehr der Schmerzen =

Studio album by Necromance
- Released: 1999
- Recorded: 1999
- Genre: Gothic metal Industrial metal
- Length: 62:00
- Label: Pleitegeier Records

Necromance chronology
White Gothic (1997)	Wiederkehr der Schmerzen (1999)	Tribulation Force (2001)

Wiederkehr der Schmerzen is the second album by the German gothic metal band Necromance, released on Pleitegeier Records in 1999.

== Recording ==
Musically, on this album the band incorporated more industrial music elements to its gothic metal. Songs such as "Megiddo" are pure instrumental industrial music pieces. The production on the album showcases progress from the previous album, being more plentiful and balanced. Otherwise the album continued on the direction characterized by distorted guitars, symphonic keyboards, Runhardt Scheffler's rough vocals, danceable drums, and dark romantic atmosphere.

"The Day of the Lord" showcases a slight pop influence, and its lyrics are directly from the Bible. "My Faithful Shepherd" is inspired by Psalm 23. The opener "Far Away" also includes catchy songwriting, and "Taste of Home" contains bizarre tempo changes. The guitarist Sandra Bogdan contributed to a few tracks with romantic vocals, including "Our Love in Our Tears," and the instrumental "Genesareth," with the warm guitar chords painting soundscapes, is considered by some critics as the best song on the album.

The title track "Wiederkehr der Schmerzen", translating to "Return of Pain," is an 18-minute instrumental, traditional industrial music collage, divided into chapters titled "Vorbereitungen der Unterwelt" ("Preparations of the Underworld"), "Sterben" ("Death"), "Ankunft des Sünders" ("Arrival of the Sinner"), "Hölle" ("Hell"), "Angst" ("Agony"), "Schmerzen" ("Pain"), "Wiederkehr der Schmerzen" ("Return of Pain"), "Immerwährende Wiederkehr der Schmerzen" ("Eternal Recurrence of the Pain"), and "Freuden des Widersachers" ("Pleasures of the Opponent"). The musical output of the chapters tries to capture the feel the titles imply. It is an esoteric, recondite piece.

The album was well received by magazines such as Rock Hard and Metal Heart. Wolf-Rüdiger Mühlmann wrote in the issue 148 of Rock Hard that the album was a significant shift in the style and that the band winds in theatrical melancholy. Metal Heart wrote in its September 1999 issue: "Necromance sparkles with real fireworks of ideas on their second album Wiederkehr der Schmerzen. Technical gothic metal, without overestimating... Genious!"

== Track listing ==
1. "Far Away" – 4:43
2. "Immortal Cry" – 3:19
3. "The Day of the Lord – 4:20
4. "Frostiger Stern" – 4:47
5. "Taste of Home" – 4:13
6. "Genezareth" – 3:21
7. "Conscience" – 3:14
8. "Megiddo" – 3:56
9. "Our Love in Our Tears" – 3:11
10. "Trugbild" – 4:17
11. "My Faithful Shepherd" – 3:52
12. "Wiederkehr der Schmerzen" – 18:35
  "Vorbereitungen der Unterwelt"
  "Sterben"
  "Ankunft des Sünders"
  "Hölle"
  "Angst"
  "Schmerzen"
  "Wiederkehr der Schmerzen"
  "Immerwährende Wiederkehr der Schmerzen"
  "Freuden des Widersachers"

== Personnel ==
- Sandra – vocals, guitar
- René – synthesizer
- Mike – guitar
- Runhardt – vocals, guitar
