= Pycnonuclear fusion =

Type of nuclear fusion that occurs at high densities & low temperatures

Pycnonuclear fusion (from Ancient Greek πυκνός (pyknós) 'dense, compact, thick') is a type of nuclear fusion reaction which occurs due to zero-point oscillations of nuclei around their equilibrium point bound in their crystal lattice. In quantum physics, the phenomenon can be interpreted as overlap of the wave functions of neighboring ions, and is proportional to the overlapping amplitude. Under the conditions of above-threshold ionization, the reactions of neutronization and pycnonuclear fusion can lead to the creation of absolutely stable environments in superdense substances.

The term "pycnonuclear" was coined by A.G.W. Cameron in 1959, but research showing the possibility of nuclear fusion in extremely dense and cold compositions was published by W. A. Wildhack in 1940.

== Astrophysics ==
Pycnonuclear reactions can occur anywhere and in any matter, but under standard conditions, the speed of the reaction is exceedingly low, and thus, have no significant role outside of extremely dense systems, neutron-rich and free electron-rich environments, such as the inner crust of a neutron star. A feature of pycnonuclear reactions is that the rate of the reaction is directly proportional to the density of the space that the reaction is occurring in, but is almost fully independent of the temperature of the environment.

Pycnonuclear reactions are observed in neutron stars or white dwarfs, with evidence present of them occurring in lab-generated deuterium-tritium plasma. Some speculations also relate the fact that Jupiter emits more radiation than it receives from the Sun with pycnonuclear reactions or cold fusion.

=== White dwarfs ===
In white dwarfs, the core is cold enough for nuclei to freeze into a crystal lattice. In a classical model, these nuclei are considered to be in their ground state. The zero-point oscillations of nuclei in the crystal lattice with energy at the energy $E_0$ at Gamow's peak equal to $E_0 \thicksim \hbar w$ can overcome the Coulomb barrier, actuating pycnonuclear reactions. A semi-analytical model indicates that in white dwarfs, a thermonuclear runaway can occur at much earlier ages than that of the universe, as the pycnonuclear reactions in the cores of white dwarfs exceed the luminosity of the white dwarfs, allowing C-burning to occur, which catalyzes the formation of type Ia supernovas in accreting white dwarfs, whose mass is equal to the Chandrasekhar mass.

Some studies indicate that the contribution of pycnonuclear reactions towards instability of white dwarfs is only significant in carbon white dwarfs, while in oxygen white dwarfs, such instability is caused mostly due to electron capture. Although other authors disagree that the pycnonuclear reactions can act as major long-term heating sources for massive (1.25 M_{☉}) white dwarfs, as their density would not suffice for a high rate of pycnonuclear reactions.

=== Black dwarfs ===
Most models indicate that white dwarfs will cool into black dwarfs, eventually converting their cores to $\ce{^56Fe}$ via pycnonuclear reactions. However, M.E. Caplan (2020) theorizes that the most massive black dwarfs (approx. 1.25 M_{☉}) may eventually collapse. As the core converts to iron, the declining electron fraction lowers the Chandrasekhar limit. If proton decay does not occur, this instability could trigger a supernova.

It is speculated that some massive black dwarfs may eventually produce supernova explosions. These will occur if pycnonuclear fusion processes much of the star to nickel-56, increasing the star's density. This would lower the Chandrasekhar limit, or the maximum mass of a stable white dwarf star, for some black dwarfs below their actual mass. If this point is reached, it would then collapse and initiate runaway nuclear fusion. The most massive to explode would be just below the Chandrasekhar limit at around 1.41 solar masses and would take of the order of 10^{1100} years, while the least massive to explode would be about 1.16 solar masses and would take of the order 10^{32000} years, totaling around 1% of all black dwarfs. One major caveat is that proton decay would decrease the mass of a black dwarf far more rapidly than pycnonuclear processes occur, preventing any supernova explosions.

=== Neutron stars ===
As the neutron stars undergo accretion, the density in the crust increases, passing the electron capture threshold. As the electron capture threshold ($\rho = 1.455 * 10^{12}$ g cm^{−3}) is exceeded, it allows for the formation of light nuclei from the process of double electron capture ($\ce{^40Mg + 2e -> ^34Ne + 6n +}$ν̅_{e}), forming the light neon nuclei and free neutrons, which further increases the density of the crust. As the density increases, the crystal lattices of neutron-rich nuclei are forced closer together due to gravitational collapse of accreting material, and at a point where the nuclei are pushed so close together that their zero-point oscillations allow them to break through the Coulomb barrier, fusion occurs. While the main site of pycnonuclear fusion within neutron stars is the inner crust, pycnonuclear reactions between light nuclei can occur even in the plasma ocean. Since the core of neutron stars was approximated to be $3*10^{14}$ g cm^{−3}, at such extreme densities, pycnonuclear reactions play a large role as demonstrated by Haensel & Zdunik, who showed that at densities of $\rho = 10^{12} - 10^{13}$ g cm^{−3}, they serve as a major heat source. In the fusion processes of the inner crust, the burning of neutron-rich nuclei ($\ce{^{34}Ne + ^{34}Ne -> ^68Ca}$) releases a lot of heat, allowing pycnonuclear fusion to perform as a major energy source, possibly even acting as an energy basin for gamma-ray bursts.

Further studies have established that most magnetars are found at densities of $\rho = 10^{10}-10^{11}$g cm^{−3}, indicating that pycnonuclear reactions along with subsequent electron capture reactions could serve as major heat sources.

=== Triple-alpha reaction ===
In Wolf–Rayet stars, the triple-alpha reaction is accommodated by the low-energy of $\ce{^8Be}$ resonance. However, in neutron stars the temperature in the core is so low that the triple-alpha reactions can occur via the pycnonuclear pathway.

== Mathematical model ==
As the density increases, the Gamow peak increases in height and shifts towards lower energy, while the potential barriers are depressed. If the potential barriers are depressed by the amount of $E_0$, the Gamow peak is shifted across the origin, making the reactions density-dependent, as the Gamow peak energy is much larger than the thermal energy. The material becomes a degenerate gas at such densities. Harrison proposed that models fully independent of temperature be called cryonuclear.

Pycnonuclear reactions can proceed in two ways: direct ($\ce{^{34}Ne + ^{34}Ne}$ or $\ce{^{40}Mg + ^{40}Mg}$) or through chain of electron capture reactions ($\ce{^25N + ^40Mg}$).

=== Uncertainties ===
The current consensus on the rate of pycnonuclear reactions is not coherent. There are currently a lot of uncertainties to consider when modelling the rate of pycnonuclear reactions, especially in spaces with high numbers of free particles. The primary focus of current research is on the effects of crystal lattice deformation and the presence of free neutrons on the reaction rate. Every time fusion occurs, nuclei are removed from the crystal lattice - creating a defect. The difficulty of approximating this model lies within the fact that the further changes occurring to the lattice and the effect of various deformations on the rate are thus far unknown. Since neighbouring lattices can affect the rate of reaction too, negligence of such deformations could lead to major discrepancies. Another confounding variable would be the presence of free neutrons in the crusts of neutron stars. The presence of free neutrons could potentially affect the Coulomb barrier, making it either taller or thicker. A study published by D.G. Yakovlev in 2006 has shown that the rate calculation of the first pycnonuclear fusion of two $\ce{^{34}Ne}$ nuclei in the crust of a neutron star can have an uncertainty magnitude of up to seven. In this study, Yakovlev also highlighted the uncertainty in the threshold of pycnonuclear fusion (e.g., at what density it starts), giving the approximate density required for the start of pycnonuclear fusion of $\rho_{pyc} \thickapprox 10^{12} - 10^{13}$g cm^{−3}, arriving at a similar conclusion as Haesnel and Zdunik. According to Haesnel and Zdunik, additional uncertainty of rate calculations in neutron stars can also be due to uneven distribution of the crustal heating, which can impact the thermal states of neutron stars before and after accretion.

In white dwarfs and neutron stars, the nuclear reaction rates can not only be affected by pycnonuclear reactions but also by the plasma screening of the Coulomb interaction. A Ukrainian Electrodynamic Research Laboratory "Proton-21", established that by forming a thin electron plasma layer on the surface of the target material, and, thus, forcing the self-compression of the target material at low temperatures, they could stimulate the process of pycnonuclear fusion. The startup of the process was due to the self-contracting plasma "scanning" the entire volume of the target material, screening the Coulomb field.

=== Screening, Quantum Diffusion & Nuclear Fusion Regimes ===
Before delving into the mathematical model, it is important to understand that pycnonuclear fusion, in its essence, occurs due to two main events:

- A phenomenon of quantum nature called quantum diffusion.
- Overlap of the wave functions of zero-point oscillations of the nuclei.

Both of these effects are heavily affected by screening. The term screening is generally used by nuclear physicists when referring to plasmas of particularly high density. In order for the pycnonuclear fusion to occur, the two particles must overcome the electrostatic repulsion between them - the energy required for this is called the Coulomb barrier. Due to the presence of other charged particles (mainly electrons) next to the reacting pair, they exert the effect of shielding - as the electrons create an electron cloud around the positively charged ions - effectively reducing the electrostatic repulsion between them, lowering the Coulomb barrier. This phenomenon of shielding is referred to as "screening", and in cases where it is particularly strong, it is called "strong screening". Consequently, in cases where the plasma has a strong screening effect, the rate of pycnonuclear fusion is substantially enhanced.

Quantum tunnelling is the foundation of the quantum physical approach to pycnonuclear fusion. It is closely intertwined with the screening effect, as the transmission coefficient $T$ depends on the height of the potential barrier, the mass of the particles, and their relative velocity (since the total energy of the system depends on the kinetic energy). From this follows that the transmission coefficient is very sensitive to the effects of screening. Thus, the effect of screening not only contributes to the reduction of the potential barrier that allows for "classical" fusion to occur via the overlap of the wave functions of the zero-point oscillations of the particles, but also to the increase of the transmission coefficient, both of which increase the rate of pycnonuclear fusion.

On top of the other various jargon related to pycnonuclear fusion, the papers also introduce various regimes, that define the rate of pycnonuclear fusion. Specifically, they identify the zero-temperature, intermediate, and thermally-enhanced regimes as their main ones.

==== One-Component Plasma (OCP) ====
The pioneers to the derivation of the rate of pycnonuclear fusion in one-component plasma (OCP) were Edwin Salpeter and David Van-Horn, with their article published in 1969. Their approach used a semiclassical method to solve the Schrödinger equation by using the Wentzel-Kramers-Brillouin (WKB) approximation, and Wigner-Seitz (WS) spheres. Their model is heavily simplified, and whilst it is primitive, is required to understand other approaches which largely extrapolated on the works of Salpeter & Van Horn. They employed the WS spheres to simplify the OCP into regions containing one ion each, with the ions situated on the vertices of a BCC crystal lattice. Then, using the WKB approximation, they resolved the effect of quantum tunnelling on the fusing nuclei. Extrapolating this to the entire lattice allowed them to arrive at their formula for the rate of pycnonuclear fusion:
$$P = {8 \over 2}{\rho \over \mu_AH} \langle p \rangle_{A_v}$$
where $\rho$ is the density of the plasma, $\mu_A$ is the mean molecular weight per electron (atomic nucleus), $H$ is a constant equal to $1.66044*10^{-24}$ and serves as a conversion factor from atomic mass units to grams, and $\langle p \rangle_{A_v}$ represents the thermal average of the pairwise reaction probability.

However, the big fault of the method proposed by Salpeter & Van-Horn is that they neglected the dynamic model of the lattice. This was improved upon by Schramm and Koonin in 1990. In their model, they found that the dynamic model cannot be neglected, but it is possible that the effects caused by the dynamicity can be cancelled out.

== See also ==
- Cold fusion
- Thermonuclear reaction
- Accretion (astrophysics)
- Plasma (physics)
- Quantum tunnelling
