= Gravastar =

Hypothesized alternative to a black hole

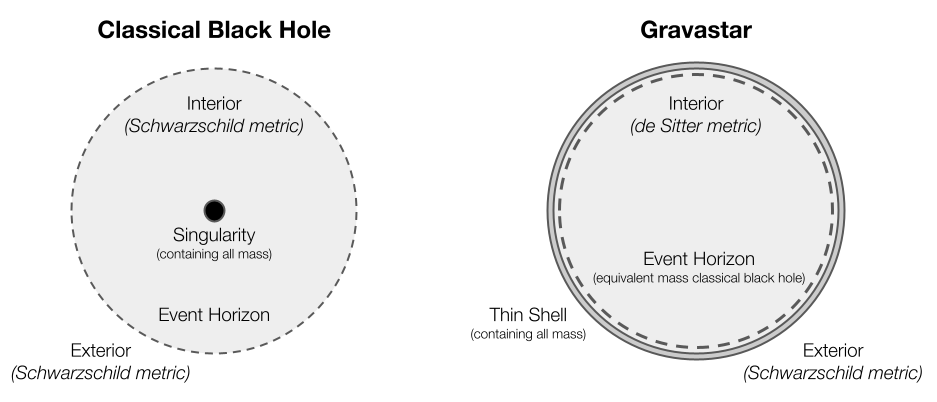
A diagram comparing the structure of a classical black hole with a gravastar.

In astrophysics, a gravastar (a blend word of "gravitational vacuum star") is an object hypothesized in a 2001 paper by Pawel O. Mazur and Emil Mottola as an alternative to the black hole theory. It has the usual black hole metric outside of the horizon, but de Sitter metric inside. A typical gravastar is as big as London, but weighing ten solar masses. On the horizon there is an ultra-thin, incredibly tight shell of entirely new, unique exotic matter. This solution to the Einstein equations is stable and has no singularities. Instead, a gravastar is filled either with dark energy or with vacuum energy, but also vacuum, only the inside one is 10^{44} times denser than the outside.

== Description ==
In the original formulation by Mazur and Mottola, a gravastar is composed of three regions, differentiated by the relationship between the pressure p and energy density ρ. The central region consists of false vacuum or "dark energy", and in this region p = −ρ . Surrounding it is a thin shell of perfect fluid where p = ρ . On the exterior is true vacuum, where p = ρ = 0 .

=== Gravastar anatomy ===
The interior of a gravastar behaves like dark energy and prevents collapse to a singularity. The inner region has thermodynamically no entropy and may be thought of as a gravitational Bose–Einstein condensate. The outer thin shell stops an event horizon from forming, which would otherwise cause light and energy to become infinitely concentrated. Severe red-shifting of photons as they climb out of the gravity well would make the thin shell also seem very cold. It is the coldest object theoretically possible at only a billionth of a degree above absolute zero.

In addition to the original thin-shell formulation, gravastars with continuous pressure have been proposed. These objects must contain anisotropic stress.

Externally, a gravastar appears similar to a black hole: it is visible by the high-energy radiation it emits while consuming matter, and by the Hawking radiation it creates. Astronomers search the sky for X-rays emitted by infalling matter to detect black holes. A gravastar would produce an identical signature. It is also possible, if the thin shell is transparent to radiation, that gravastars may be distinguished from ordinary black holes by different gravitational lensing properties, as the paths of massless particles may pass through it.

=== Discovery ===
Mazur and Mottola suggest that the violent creation of a gravastar might be an explanation for the origin of our universe and many other universes because all the matter from a collapsing star would implode "through" the central hole and explode into a new dimension and expand forever, which would be consistent with the current theories regarding the Big Bang. This "new dimension" exerts an outward pressure on the Bose-Einstein condensate layer and prevents it from collapsing further.

Gravastars also could provide a mechanism for describing how dark energy accelerates the expansion of the universe. One possible hypothesis uses Hawking radiation as a means to exchange energy between the "parent" universe and the "child" universe, and so cause the rate of expansion to accelerate, but this area is under much speculation.

Gravastar formation may provide an alternative explanation for sudden and intense gamma-ray bursts throughout space.

LIGO's observations of gravitational waves from colliding objects have been found to be either inconsistent with the gravastar concept, or to be indistinguishable from ordinary black holes, a plausible scenario as from the outside at least, a gravastar is completely indistinguishable from a black hole.

== Comparison with black holes ==
By taking quantum physics into account, the gravastar hypothesis attempts to resolve contradictions caused by conventional black hole theories.

=== Event horizons ===
In a gravastar, the event horizon is not present. The layer of positive-pressure fluid would lie just outside the radius where an event horizon would be, prevented from complete collapse by the inner false vacuum.

=== Dynamic stability of gravastars ===
In 2007, theoretical work indicated that under certain conditions, gravastars as well as other alternative black hole models are not stable when they rotate. Theoretical work has also shown that certain rotating gravastars are stable assuming certain angular velocities, shell thicknesses, and compactnesses. It is also possible that some gravastars which are mathematically unstable may be physically stable over cosmological timescales. Theoretical support for the feasibility of gravastars does not exclude the existence of black holes as shown in other theoretical studies.

== See also ==
- Acoustic metric
- Acoustic Hawking radiation from sonic black holes
- Black star (semiclassical gravity)
- Dark-energy star
- Shell collapsar
