= Black Star sapphire =

Black crystal

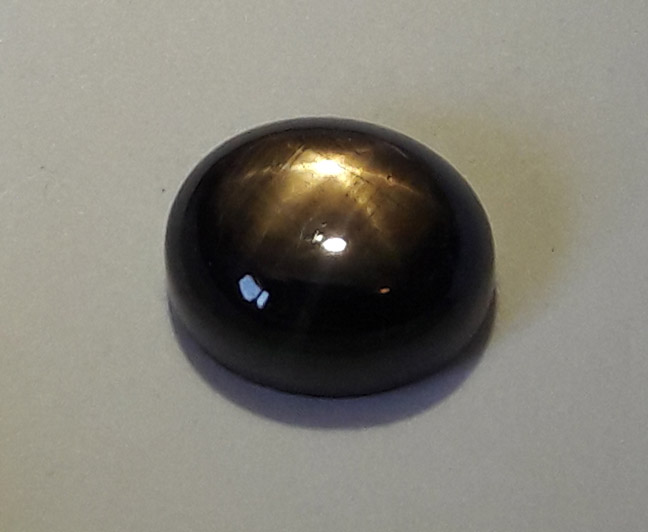

General
- Category: Oxide mineral

Identification
- Color: Black

Black star sapphire, also known as 'natural star sapphire', is a type of corundum (aluminum oxide). It is usually cut into a dome shape to show a star feature. If it is cut with a flat or almost flat face, then a golden colour is revealed. The chemical composition and features for black star were analyzed in the Journal of Gemmology.

Black star typically has a high Fe/Ti oxide (brown colour), perpendicular hematite-ilmenite needles (gold), magnetite platelets (black), asterism (the star effect) and hexagonal growth. Hematite-ilmenite needles, which are responsible for the golden colour, intersect at about 120 degrees in a three-fold direction of the basal pinacoid.

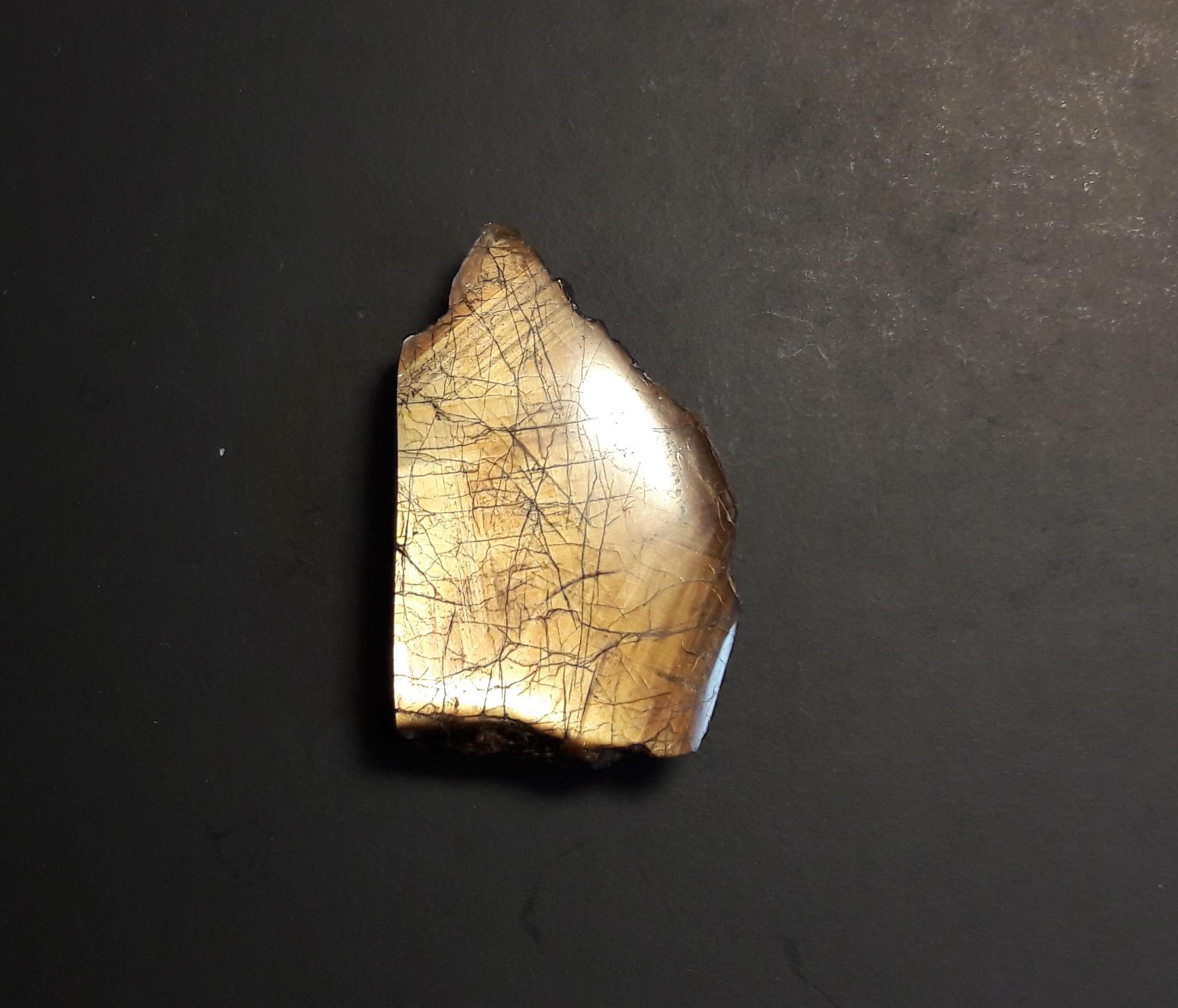
If the face is cut flat it looks golden

Black star sapphire is found in Thailand, Cambodia, Tanzania, Australia, Sri Lanka, Sierra Leone, Laos and many other countries, although supply is growing continuously exhausted, and mine yields have decreased. The mines on the Thai/Cambodia border were reported to be almost exhausted of clear high-value gems by the late 1990s. Around this time, more of the less-valuable opaque black star sapphire was polished into round cabochons. Black star needles are perpendicular (cited above) meaning that the sides are dark. The flat face is a bright gold but loses it as soon as a dome is cut.

The Journal of gemmology mentions polysynthetic twinning (parallel lines). The star effect occurs in other sapphire colours and is often translucent. Blue colour star sapphire contains inclusions that cause the asterism. The inclusions mean that the material is mostly translucent instead of clear.
