= The Dark Side of the Sun (disambiguation) =

The Dark Side of the Sun is a novel by Terry Pratchett.

The Dark Side of the Sun may also refer to:

- The Dark Side of the Sun (film), a 1988 Yugoslavian film starring Brad Pitt
- The Dark Side of the Sun (British serial), a BBC television serial
- The Dark Side of the Sun (1983 book), a novelization by Hugh Miller and Michael J. Bird of the above BBC TV serial.
- "The Dark Side of the Sun" (Space: Above and Beyond episode), an episode from the science fiction TV show Space: Above and Beyond
- "Darkside of the Sun", a song by Tokio Hotel, from the 2009 album Humanoid
