= Children of the Black Sun =

Studio album by Non
- Released: August 20, 2002
- Recorded: 2002
- Genre: Dark ambient
- Length: 30:58
- Label: Mute Records
- Producer: Bob Ferbreche

Non chronology
| Receive the Flame (1999) | Children of the Black Sun (2002) | Terra Incognita: Selected Ambient Works, 1975 to Present (2004) |

Professional ratings
Review scores
| Source | Rating |
|---|---|
| Allmusic | 4/5 stars |
| Pitchfork Media | 0.5/10 |
| Stylus Magazine | C+ |

Children of the Black Sun is a studio album by Non, the primary project of musician Boyd Rice, released by Mute Records in 2002. Consists of seven tracks all of which are minimalist ambient noise compositions. One track, for instance, includes a French horn and a number of other instruments crescendoing while playing only one note, the result being a hypnotic and surprisingly varied composition. The album includes both a standard CD version and a DVD version recorded in Dolby 5.1 channel sound.

== Track listing ==
1. "Arka"
2. "Black Sun"
3. "Serpent of the Heavens"
4. "Serpent of the Abyss"
5. "The Underground Stream"
6. "The Fountain of Fortune"
7. "Son of the Sun"
