= Sort sol =

Migratory bird behavior

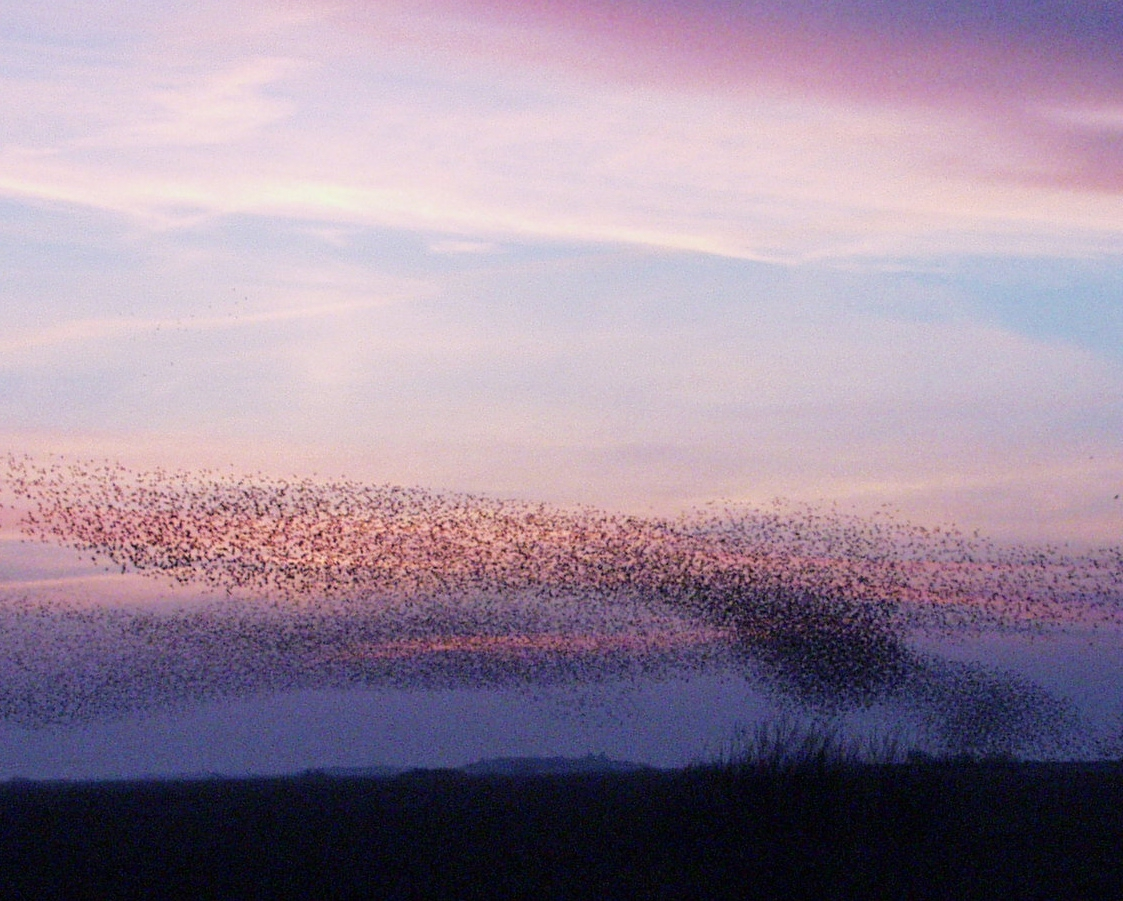
A formation of starlings in the marshlands near Tønder, Denmark.

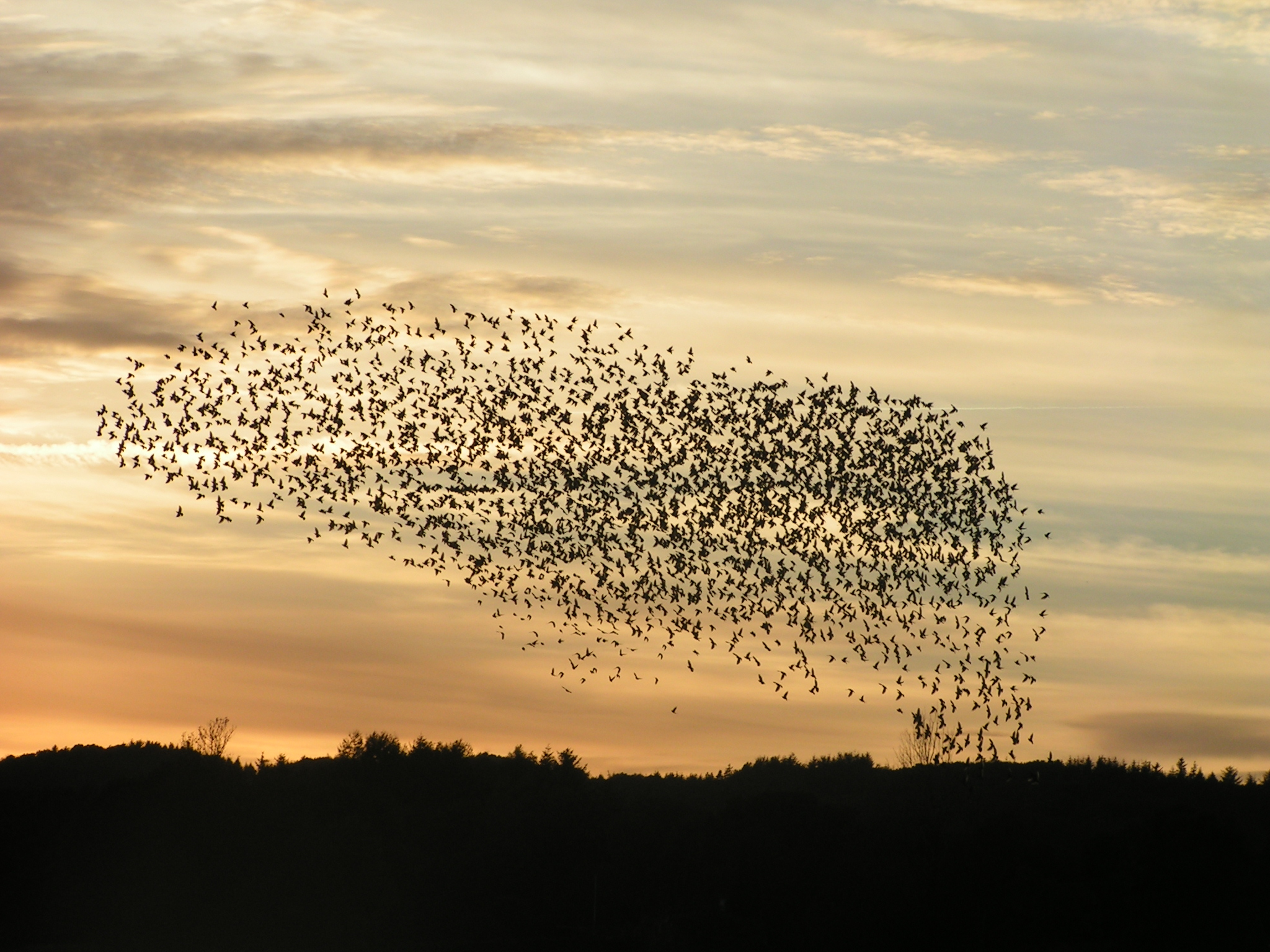
Blick of sort sol

Sort sol is a murmuration, a flocking behavior that occurs in the marshlands in southwestern Jutland, Denmark, in particular the marsh near Tønder and Ribe. Very large numbers of migratory starlings gather there in spring and autumn when they move between their winter grounds in southern Europe and their summer breeding grounds in Scandinavia and other countries near the Baltic Sea.

Sort sol takes place in the hours just after sunset. The birds gather in large flocks and form huge formations in the sky just before they decide on a location to roost for the night. The movements of the formations have been likened to a kind of dance or ballet and the birds are so numerous that they seem to obliterate the sunset, hence the term "sort sol" (Danish for "black sun"). Sort sol in the marsh near Tønder can occasionally comprise a formation of up to one million birds. Usually flocks break up when the number of individuals exceeds about half a million birds, due to excessive internal disturbances in the flock.

If a predatory bird enters the flock, the starlings initiate a veritable bombardment of droppings and vomit to soil the feathers of the predator. In rare cases the sticky deposits may render the predator unable to stay airborne.

== See also ==
- Flock (birds)
- Swarm
