= Shell collapsar =

Hypothetical compact astrophysical object

A shell collapsar is a proposed alternative explanation for the observations of black hole candidates. In this concept, matter collapses onto the event horizon, forming a compact shell of ultra-high density. Being of neutron star size (~11km), this hypothetical object strongly deflects light rays like a black hole, but has no central point-like singularity. The term shell collapsar was first proposed by Trevor W. Marshall in 2009 and 2012, then more firmly established in 2016. It predicts the existence of neutron star masses beyond the Tolman–Oppenheimer–Volkoff limit of 2.1 M_{☉}, thus providing an alternative to stellar-mass black holes for the highly compact bodies that merge to produce gravitational wave signals.

In 2011, Jun Ni explored the theoretical framework of neutron stars within the context of general relativity. He discusses solutions to the field equations that do not impose a maximum mass limit on neutron stars, which challenges the conventional understanding that there is a maximum mass beyond which a neutron star would collapse into a black hole. Ni introduced a new class of neutron stars that can exist beyond this traditional limit, suggesting that these stars could have significantly higher masses than previously thought. He coined the term "超重星" (Chōjūsei) in Japanese, which translates to "supermassive star" in English, to describe these neutron stars that defy the established mass constraints. Luboš Neslušan suggested such a solution with the gravitation potential minimum in the shell of the neutron star instead of the centre and references Ni. deLyra shows similar models of shell-like compact gas objects. New research from Matthew R. Edwards even suggest a shell universe model based on Ni's solutions in order to reduce the Hubble Tension.

A shell collapsar may be void inside as time dilation delays indefinitely the entry of mass-particles. Marshall's solution however, predicts intense gravitational field energy there, arising from Einsteinian gravitation in the highly non-linear regime. As time dilation is extreme on the collapsar surface (just outside the event horizon), accreting neutron matter can be viewed as freezing onto the outer shell, as described in the ‘frozar’ model. Z. Zakir conceives that outward gravitational forces arise in the interior and push inner matter into the ‘frozar’ shell.

The shell collapsar is a special case of a gravastar. With the gravastar, an exotic form of matter stabilizes the object with the equation of state of dark energy inside. The shell collapsar comes to a similar result with ordinary neutron star matter and simply Einstein's field equations describing intense gravitational energy density, comparable as E/c² to the neutron matter density.
