= Black star (semiclassical gravity) =

Hypothetical gravitational object composed of matter

A black star is a gravitational object composed of matter. It is a theoretical alternative to the black hole concept from general relativity. The theoretical construct was created through the use of semiclassical gravity theory. A similar structure should also exist for the Einstein–Maxwell–Dirac equations system, which is the (super) classical limit of quantum electrodynamics, and for the Einstein–Yang–Mills–Dirac system, which is the (super) classical limit of the standard model.

A black star does not require an event horizon, and may or may not be a transitional phase between a collapsing star and a singularity. A black star is created when matter compresses at a rate significantly less than the free fall velocity of a hypothetical particle falling to the center of its star. Quantum processes create vacuum polarization, producing a form of degeneracy pressure preventing spacetime (and the particles held within it) from occupying the same space at the same time. This vacuum energy is theoretically unlimited and, if built up quickly enough, will stop gravitational collapse from creating a singularity. This may entail an ever-decreasing rate of collapse leading to an infinite collapse time or asymptotically approaching a radius bigger than zero.

A black star with a radius slightly greater than the predicted event horizon for an equivalent-mass black hole will appear very dark, because almost all light produced will be drawn back to the star, and any escaping light will be severely gravitationally redshifted. It will appear almost exactly like a black hole. It will feature Hawking radiation, as well as thermal Planckian radiation that will closely resemble the expected Hawking radiation of an equivalent black hole.

The predicted interior of a black star will be composed of this strange state of spacetime, with each length in depth heading inward appearing the same as a black star of equivalent mass and radius with the overlayment stripped off. Temperatures increase with depth towards the center.

== See also ==
- Black hole
- Dark-energy star
- Fuzzball (string theory)
- Gravastar

== Sources ==
- Barceló, Carlos; Liberati, Stefano; Sonego, Sebastiano; Visser, Matt (October 2009). "Black Stars, Not Holes". Scientific American. Vol. 301, no. 4. pp. 38–45. doi:10.1038/scientificamerican1009-38. ISSN 0036-8733.
- Barceló, Carlos; Liberati, Stefano; Sonego, Sebastiano; Visser, Matt (19 February 2008). "Fate of gravitational collapse in semiclassical gravity". Physical Review D. 77 (4) 044032. arXiv:0712.1130. Bibcode:2008PhRvD..77d4032B. doi:10.1103/PhysRevD.77.044032. ISSN 1550-7998. S2CID 20016596.
- Visser, Matt; Barcelo, Carlos; Liberati, Stefano; Sonego, Sebastiano (12 October 2009). Small, dark, and heavy: But is it a black hole?. Black Holes in General Relativity and String Theory. Sissa Medialab. p. 010. arXiv:0902.0346. Bibcode:2009arXiv0902.0346V. doi:10.22323/1.075.0010.
