= Umbra et Imago =

Neue Deutsche Härte band

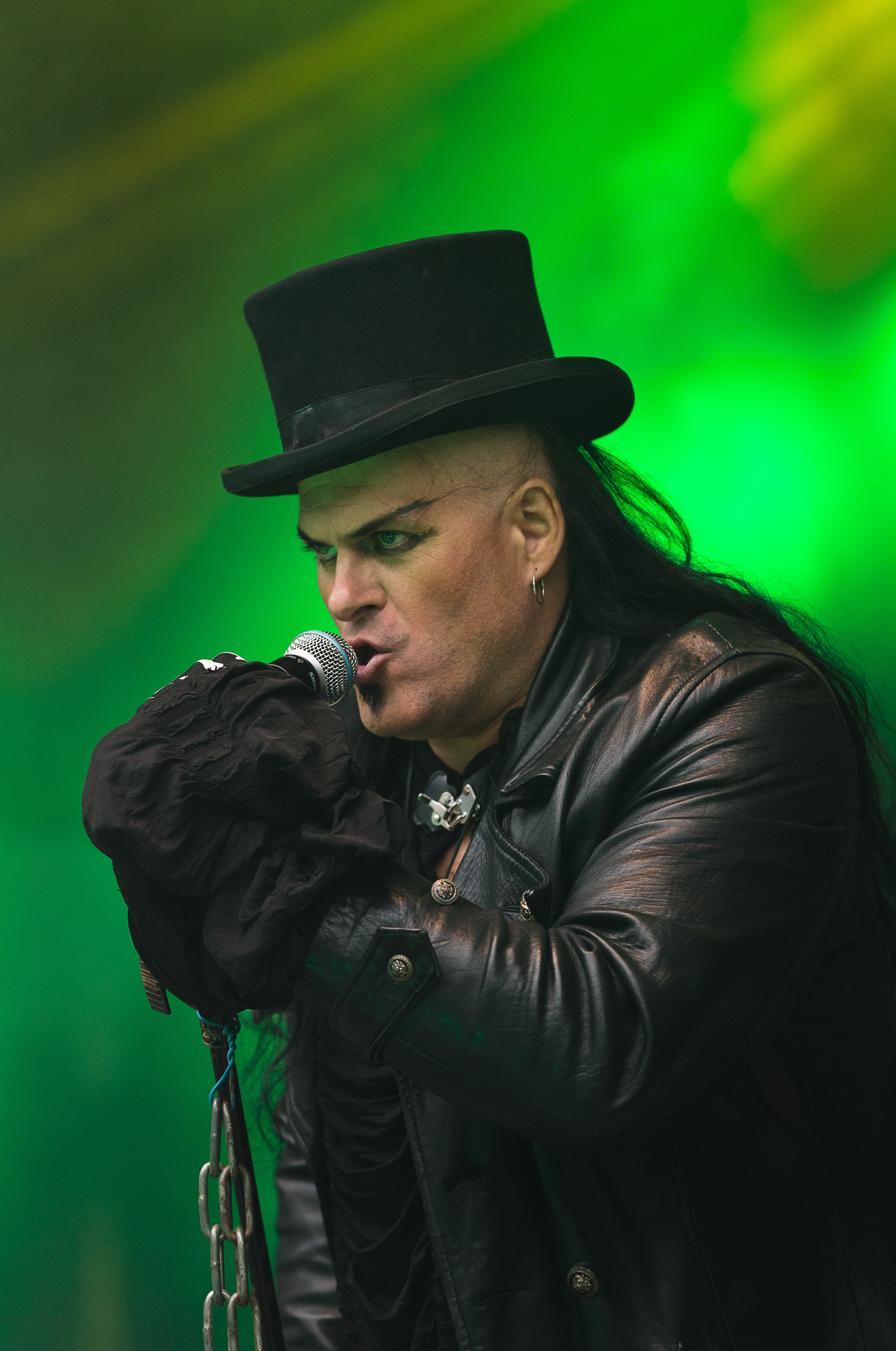
- Mozart at the Nocturnal Culture Night festival in 2015

Background information
- Origin: Karlsruhe, Germany
- Genres: Gothic rock, gothic metal, dark wave, Neue Deutsche Härte, industrial metal
- Years active: 1991–present
- Label: Ausfahrt
- Spinoffs: Dracul
- Members: Mozart; Freddy Stürze; Sascha Danneberger; Madeleine Le Roy
- Past members: Kris; Jochen Ritter; Chris Tin; Torsten B. Matze B. Michael Gillian; Achim Vogel; Alex Perin; Andi Lehnert; Lutz Demmler; Nail
- Website: umbraetimago.de

Umbra et Imago (Latin for 'Shadow and Image') is a German gothic metal and Neue Deutsche Härte band formed in Autumn 1991. The original lineup consisted of singer Mozart (Manuel Munz), Michael Gillian, Nail and Torsten B. Except for Mozart all other founding members left the band, but he is still influential to the music of Umbra and Imago.

== History ==
In 1991, Umbra et Imago were created as a side-project of The Electric Avantgarde. In the following year, the two bands were still existing alongside. There were plans for The Electric Avantgarde to change its style to death metal, but those were soon dropped. The band dissolved and was later reformed as Dracul so that Umbra et Imago became Mozart's main project.

In 1992 Umbra et Imago played their first stage shows, where visual effects played an important role. While the band's style was still dominated by electronic influences, there were frequent appearances of guest musicians such as Peter Heppner of Wolfsheim. The band began to develop an eccentric image and they were known for their fancy concerts. Umbra et Imago polarized critics and were even publicly criticized. In the same year, their album Träume, Sex und Tod was published, one year later Infantile Spiele was released.

As their album tracks often exceeded lengths of 10 minutes, they were unsuited for play in discothèques and were not included to DJs' programs. Because of that, Umbra et Imago created a remix of their song "Erotica" which they called ZöllerMussEsSpielen Mix (Zöller Must Play It Mix), referring to Michael Zöller, a resident DJ of Bochum's Zwischenfall discothèque. Despite its length, "Gothic Erotic" from the 1993 album Infantile Spiele remained the band's best known song.

In 1995, Michael Gillian and Torsten B. left the band, followed by Nail soon after. They were replaced by Lutz Demmler and Alex Perin. With the change in the line-up came a change in style. The music shifted towards guitar sounds and was expanded by hard rock elements on the album Gedanken eines Vampirs. This change was completed in 1996 with the album Mystica Sexualis, which was now gothic metal. During live shows, the band would have fetish models on stage, founding their current stage concept. The 1997 maxi single Kein Gott und keine Liebe saw an increase in Neue Deutsche Härte elements and Umbra et Imago were compared to bands such as Rammstein.

In 2003, guitarist Freddy Stürze left the band but joined them in 2011 again.

According to their official website, Opus Magnus, published in 2010, was Umbra and Imago's final studio album while a new DVD with live material and old songs was released in 2011.

== Work and appearance ==
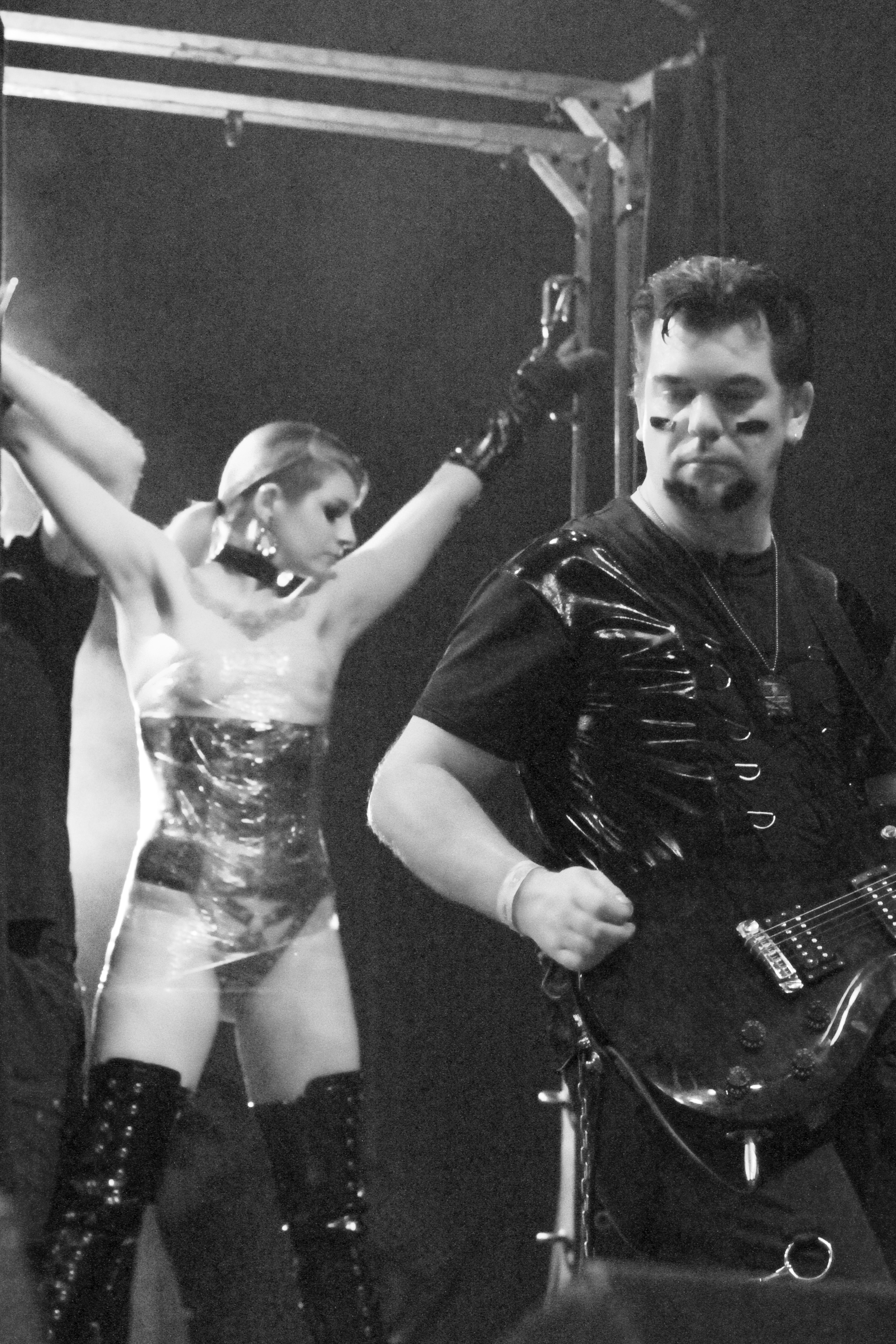
Stage show at the Wave-Gotik-Treffen in 2014

From the beginning, Umbra et Imago have been a concept band picking up Sigmund Freud's idea that sexuality was the center of our being. They processed sadomasochistic fantasies through their cynical lyrics. According to the band, this theme was chosen because it represents the most intellectual form of sexuality.

The lyrics by Umbra et Imago are dominated by a warped, subliminal humour, criticism of human society's flaws and cynical self-irony. The clichés dealt with thereby and their exaggerated depictions polarize the meaning of the band. Sexuality is major component of the concept but is no longer dominating.

Their stage shows are still infamous, incorporating BDSM acts and complex pyrotechnics into their live shows.

Lutz Demler has eventually become the producer of Umbra et Imago and other bands.

== Members ==
=== Current line-up ===
- Mozart (vocals)
- Sascha Danneberger (guitar)
- Freddy S. (guitar)

=== Former members ===
- Kris (vocals)
- Jochen Ritter (drums)
- Chris Tin (samples)
- Torsten B. (bass)
- Matze B. (keyboard)
- Michael Gillian (keyboards)
- Achim Vogel (keyboard)
- Alex Perin (guitar)
- Andi Lehnert (guitar)
- Nail (guitar)
- Lutz Demmler (bass)

== Discography ==
=== EP ===
- Träume, Sex und Tod (1992)
- Remember Dito (1994)

=== Albums ===
- Infantile Spiele (1993)
- Gedanken eines Vampirs (1995)
- Mystica Sexualis (1996)
- Machina Mundi (1998)
- Mea Culpa (2000)
- Dunkle Energie (2001)
- Memento Mori (2004)
- Opus Magnus (2010)
- Davon geht die Welt nicht unter (2011)
- Die Unsterblichen (2015)
- Die Unsterblichen - Das zweite Buch (2017)

=== Singles ===
- Sex Statt Krieg (1996)
- Kein Gott und keine Liebe (1997)
- Weinst Du? feat. Tanzwut (1999)
- Feuer Und Licht (2001)
- Sweet Gwendoline (2004)
- Gott Will Es (2007)
- Ohne Dich (2011)
- Radiosong (2014)

=== DVD ===
- Die Welt Brennt (2002)
- Motus Animi (2005)
- Imago Picta (2006)
- Past Bizarre (2007)

=== Live albums ===
- The Hard Years - Das Live-Album (1997)
- The Hard Years II (2007)
