= Black dwarf =

Theoretical stellar remnant

Characteristics
- Type: Hypothetical class of future stellar remnant
- Mass range: Up to Chandrasekhar limit (non-rotating)
- Temperature: Under 798 K (Draper point)
- Average luminosity: negligible (visual) ≤ 23 kW/m^{2} (total)

External links
- Media category
- Q5976

A black dwarf is a theoretical stellar remnant, specifically a white dwarf that has cooled sufficiently to no longer emit significant heat or light. Because the time required for a white dwarf to reach this state is calculated to significantly exceed the current age of the universe (13.79 billion years), no black dwarfs are expected to exist in the universe at the present time. The temperature of the coolest white dwarfs is one observational limit on the universe's age.

The term "black dwarf" has also been applied to hypothetical late-stage cooled brown dwarfs – substellar objects with insufficient mass (less than approximately 0.07 M_{☉}) to maintain hydrogen-burning nuclear fusion.

== Composition ==
A black dwarf would be mainly composed of carbon and oxygen, but it may also have trace amounts of other elements like neon and magnesium.

== Formation ==
A white dwarf is what remains of a main-sequence star of low or medium mass (below approximately 9 to 10 solar masses (M_{☉})) after it has either expelled or fused all the elements for which it has sufficient temperature to fuse. What is left is then a dense sphere of electron-degenerate matter that cools slowly by thermal radiation, eventually becoming a black dwarf.

If black dwarfs were to exist, they would be challenging to detect because, by definition, they would emit very little radiation. They would, however, be detectable through their gravitational influence. Various white dwarfs cooled below 3,900 K (3,630 °C; 6,560 °F) (equivalent to M0 spectral class) were found in 2012 by astronomers using MDM Observatory's 2.4 meter telescope. They are estimated to be 11 to 12 billion years old.

Because the far-future evolution of stars depends on physical questions which are poorly understood, such as the nature of dark matter and the possibility and rate of proton decay (which is yet to be proven to exist), it is not known precisely how long it would take white dwarfs to cool to blackness. Barrow and Tipler estimate that it would take 10^{15} years for a white dwarf to cool to 5 K (−268.15 °C; −450.67 °F); however, if weakly interacting massive particles (WIMPs) exist, interactions with these particles may keep some white dwarfs much warmer than this for approximately 10^{25} years. If protons are not stable, white dwarfs will also be kept warm by energy released from proton decay. For a hypothetical proton lifetime of 10^{37} years, Adams and Laughlin calculate that proton decay will raise the effective surface temperature of an old one-solar-mass white dwarf to approximately 0.06 K (−273.09 °C; −459.56 °F). Although cold, this is thought to be hotter than the cosmic microwave background radiation temperature 10^{37} years in the future.

It is speculated that some massive black dwarfs may eventually produce supernova explosions. These will occur if pycnonuclear (density-based) fusion processes much of the star to nickel-56, which decays into iron via emitting a positron. This would lower the Chandrasekhar limit, or the maximum mass of a stable white dwarf star, for some black dwarfs below their actual mass. If this point is reached, it would then collapse and initiate runaway nuclear fusion. The most massive to explode would be just below the Chandrasekhar limit at around 1.41 solar masses and would take of the order of 10^{1100} years, while the least massive to explode would be about 1.16 solar masses and would take of the order 10^{32000} years, totaling around 1% of all black dwarfs. One major caveat is that proton decay would decrease the mass of a black dwarf far more rapidly than pycnonuclear processes occur, preventing any supernova explosions.

== The Sun as a black dwarf ==
Once the Sun stops fusing helium in its core and ejects its layers in a planetary nebula in about 8 billion years, it will become a white dwarf and, over trillions of years, eventually no longer emit any light. After that, the Sun will not be visible to the equivalent of the naked eye, removing it from optical view even if the gravitational effects are evident. The estimated time for the Sun to cool enough to become a black dwarf is at least 10^{15} (1 quadrillion) years, though it could take much longer than this, if weakly interacting massive particles (WIMPs) exist, as described above. The described phenomena are considered a promising method of verification for the existence of WIMPs and black dwarfs.

== See also ==
- Degenerate matter – Type of dense exotic matter in physics
- Heat death of the universe – Possible fate of the universe
- Carbon planet – Hypothetical type of planet that contains more carbon than oxygen
- Terrestrial planet – Planet that is composed primarily of silicate rocks or metals
- Chthonian planet – Gas giants with their atmospheric layers stripped
