= Internal measurement =

In quantum mechanics, internal measurement refers to the measurement of a quantum system by an observer (referred to as an internal observer or endo-observer).

A quantum measurement represents the action of a measuring device on a quantum system. When the measuring device is a part of the measured quantum system, the measurement proceeds internally in relation to the whole system.

Internal measurement theory was first introduced by Koichiro Matsuno and developed by Yukio-Pegio Gunji. They expanded on the original ideas of Robert Rosen and Howard Pattee regarding quantum measurement in living systems viewed as natural internal observers that belong to the same scale of the observed objects. According to Matsuno, an internal measurement is accompanied by a redistribution of probabilities that leave them entangled in accordance with the many-worlds interpretation of quantum mechanics by Everett. However, this form of quantum entanglement does not survive in an external measurement, in which the mapping to real numbers takes place and the result is revealed in classical spacetime, as the Copenhagen interpretation suggests. This means that the internal measurement concept unifies the current alternative interpretations of quantum mechanics.

== Internal measurement and theoretical biology ==
The concept of internal measurement is important for theoretical biology, as living organisms can be regarded as endo-observers having their internal self-referential encoding. An internal measurement leads to an iterative recursive process which appears as the development and evolution of the system where any solution is destined to be relative. The evolutionary increase of complexity becomes possible when the genotype emerges as a system distinct from the phenotype and embedded into it, which separates energy-degenerate rate-independent genetic symbols from the rate-dependent dynamics of construction that they control. Evolution in this concept, which is related to autopoiesis, becomes its own cause, a universal property of our world.

== Internal measurement and the problem of self ==
The self can be attributed to the internal quantum state with entangled probabilities. This entanglement can be held for prolonged times in the systems with low dissipation without demolition. According to Matsuno, organisms exploit thermodynamic gradients by acting as heat engines to drastically reduce the effective temperature within macromolecular complexes which can potentially provide the maintenance of long-living coherent states in the microtubules of nervous system. The concept of internal measurement develops the ideas of Schrödinger who suggested in "What is life?" that the nature of the self is quantum mechanical, i.e. the self is attributed to an internal state beyond quantum reduction, which generates emergent events by applying quantum reduction externally and observing it.

== See also ==
- Endophysics
- Interpretations of quantum mechanics
- Autopoiesis
