= J. Barkley Rosser Jr. =

American economist

- Born: April 12, 1948; Ithaca, New York, United States
- Died: January 10, 2023 (aged 74); Harrisonburg, Virginia, U.S.

Academic background
- Education: UW Madison, Wisconsin, U.S.

Academic work
- Discipline: Economics, Complexity
- Institutions: James Madison University (professor)
- Awards: Fellow of Economists for Peace and Security, Outstanding Faculty Award from the State Council on Higher Education in Virginia
- Website: Information at IDEAS / RePEc

John Barkley Rosser Jr. (April 12, 1948 – January 10, 2023) was a mathematical economist and Professor of Economics at James Madison University in Harrisonburg, Virginia since 1988. He was known for work in nonlinear economic dynamics, including applications in economics of catastrophe theory, chaos theory, and complexity theory (complex dynamics, complexity economics). With Marina V. Rosser he invented the concept of the "new traditional economy". He introduced into economic discourse the concepts of chaotic bubbles, chaotic hysteresis (op. cit., p. 326), and econochemistry. He also invented the concepts of the megacorpstate and hypercyclic morphogenesis. He was the first to provide a mathematical model of the period of financial distress in a speculative bubble. With Marina V. Rosser and Ehsan Ahmed, he was the first to argue for a two-way positive link between income inequality (economic inequality) and the size of an underground economy in a nation. Rosser's equation has been used to forecast ratios of future Social Security benefits to current ones in real terms.

== Background and personal life ==
Born in Ithaca, New York, Rosser received a Bachelor of Arts in economics with a minor in mathematics in 1969, an Master of Arts in economics in 1972, and a Ph.D. in economics in 1976, studying with Eugene Smolensky, all from the University of Wisconsin–Madison.

On August 15, 1984, he became legally engaged to the former Marina Rostislavovna Vcherashnaya in Moscow, USSR, officially set to be married at 3 p.m., November 13, 1984. After he returned to the United States, she was forced to resign from her position as Senior Researcher in the Institute of World Economy and International Relations (IMEMO). He was not granted a visa to return to Moscow to marry her, making them into a blocked marriage case. This violated the Helsinki Accords, signed by the Soviet Union in 1975. After diplomatic efforts, linked to the emerging perestroika program of Soviet leader, Mikhail Gorbachev, their case was resolved when Marina was allowed to travel to the United States on April 4, 1987. This was the first resolution of such a case in the Soviet Union, and became a precedent, helping to establish in international law more generally the right of people to marry freely whom they choose across national boundaries. They married on May 24, 1987, and she is now Professor of Economics at James Madison University also.

His father was mathematician J. Barkley Rosser Sr..

Rosser Jr. died in Harrisonburg, Virginia, on January 10, 2023, from an infection that led to heart valve failure.

== Career ==
Rosser joined the economics department at James Madison University in Harrisonburg, Virginia in 1977, where he has been Professor of Economics since 1988 and Kirby L. Cramer Jr. Professor Business Administration since 1996. He has published several books and over 200 journal articles, book chapters, and book reviews in a wide variety of sub-fields of economics (see External Link for recent papers and complete cv). He served as Editor of the Journal of Economic Behavior and Organization from 2001 to 2010. In 2012 he became Founding Editor-in-Chief of the Review of Behavioral Economics. As of 2018, he was also Coeditor of New Palgrave Dictionary of Economics, 4th edition.

In 2009, Rosser was named a Fellow of Economists for Peace and Security. In 2010 he received a festschrift, Nonlinear Dynamics in Economics, Finance, and the Social Sciences: Essays in Honour of John Barkley Rosser Jr., edited by Gian-Italo Bischi, Carl Chiarella, and Laura Gardini, Berlin Heidelberg: Springer. In 2011, he received an Outstanding Faculty Award from the State Council on Higher Education in Virginia. In 2012 he was named Ambassador of the University of Urbino, Italy. Starting in 2007 he blogged at Econospeak, http://econospeak.blogspot.com.

In 2019, Rosser was elected President of the Society for Chaos Theory in Psychology and Life Sciences.

== Work ==
=== Megacorpstate ===
Megacorpstate is a neologism by Rosser that described a form of market structure that designs new strategies to systematize the cartel power in the world. This particular market framework consists of oligopolistic interdependent nations-states and multinational corporations, which have established alliance to own majority of the market power. The most prominent organizations within the structure are OPEC and the Seven Sisters that include Exxon, Mobil, Socal, Royal Dutch-Shell, BP, Texaco and Gulf.

Alfred Eichner, creative theorist, Keynesian economist and Rutgers University economics professor introduced the term the "megacorp" in his book "The Megacorp and Oligopoly" (1976). The term was initially used to describe the powerful and expansive corporate groups that held monopolistic power over multiple markets. Like many intellectuals who studied Eichner's work, J.Barkley Rosser. Jr, endeavoured to expand the ideas and research on megacorporations. He recognized a strong alliance present between the monopolistically powerful multinational oil corporation groups and nation states. As a result of such interlocking relationships and trade, these participants formed a rather rare market structure. After careful analysis and consideration, Rosser decided on labeling the new formed market, "Megacorpstate".

=== Hypercyclic morphogenesis ===
Hypercyclic morphogenesis refers to the emergence of a higher order of self-reproducing structure or organization or hierarchy within a system, first introduced by Rosser in 1991 (Chap. 12). It involves combining the idea of the hypercycle, an idea due to Manfred Eigen and Peter Schuster (1979), with that of morphogenesis, an idea due to D’Arcy W.Thompson (1917). The hypercycle involves the problem in biochemistry of molecules combining in a self-reacting group that is able to stay together, posited by Eigen and Schuster as the foundation for the emergence of multi-cellular organisms. Thompson saw morphogenesis as a central part of the development of an organism as cell differentiation led to new organs appearing as it develops and grows. Alan Turing (1952) would study the chemistry and mathematics involved in such a process, which would also be studied mathematically by René Thom (1972) in his formulation of catastrophe theory.

Rosser suggested applications in political economy such as the emergence of the European Union out of the conscious actions of the leaders of its constituent nation states (1992), or the appearance of a higher level in an urban hierarchy during economic development (1994). It has been applied to the emergence of higher levels in an ecological hierarchy (Rosser, Folke, Günther, Isomäki, Perrings, and Puu, 1994), and it can be argued that the final stage of such a development for combined ecologic-economic systems would be the noosphere of Vladimir I. Vernadsky (1945).
