= Endophysics =

The term endophysics (lit. “physics from within”) was coined by the American physicist David Finkelstein in a letter to the German biochemist Otto E. Rössler, who originally came up with the concept. It refers to the study of how observations are affected and limited by the observer being within the universe. This is in contrast with "exophysics," which assumes a system observed from the “outside”.

== See also ==
- Physics
- Internal measurement (This notion is very similar to endophysics.)
