= Burning Ship fractal =

Complex plane fractal

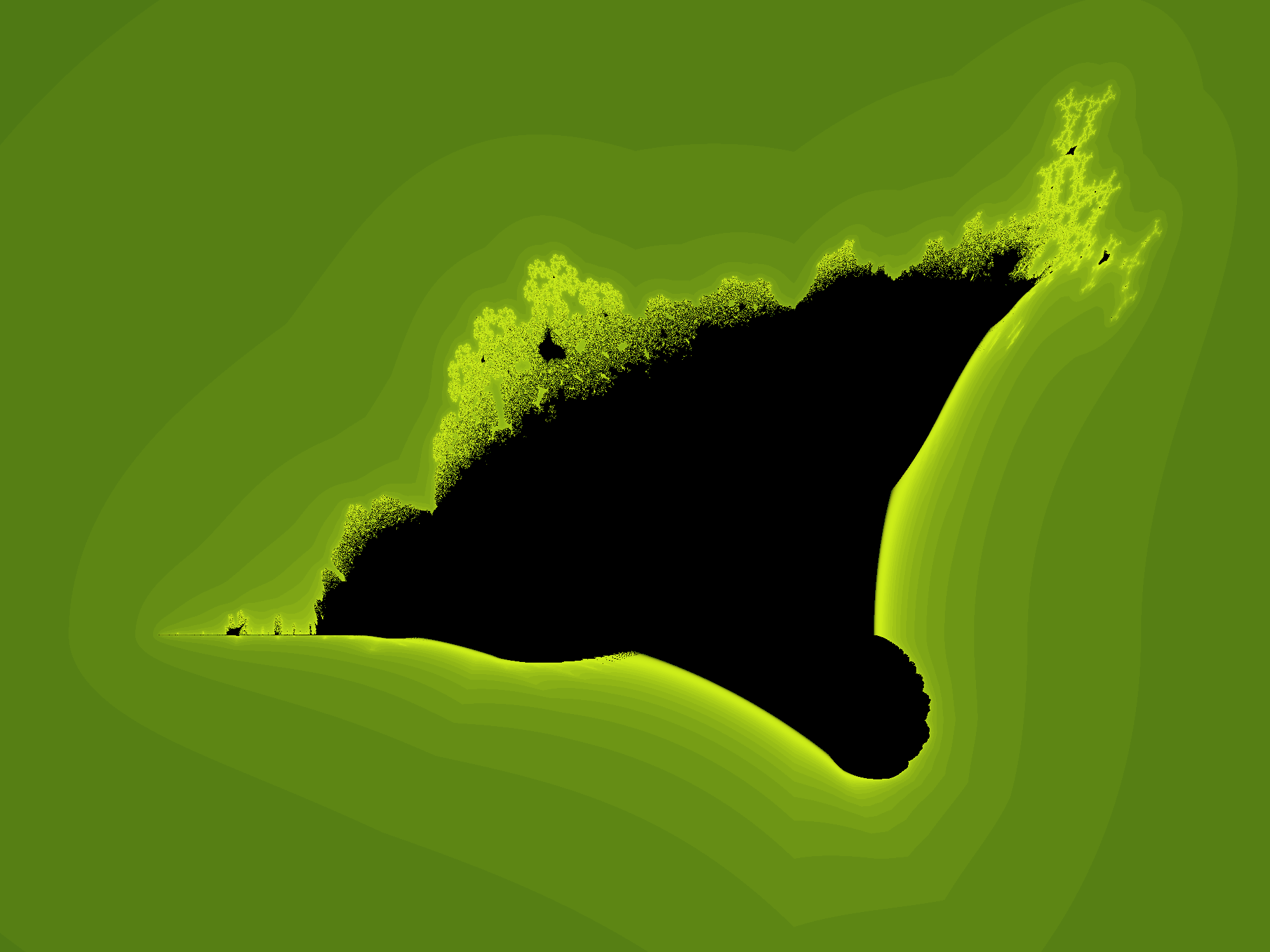
The Burning Ship fractal plotted on the complex plane within a continuously colored environment

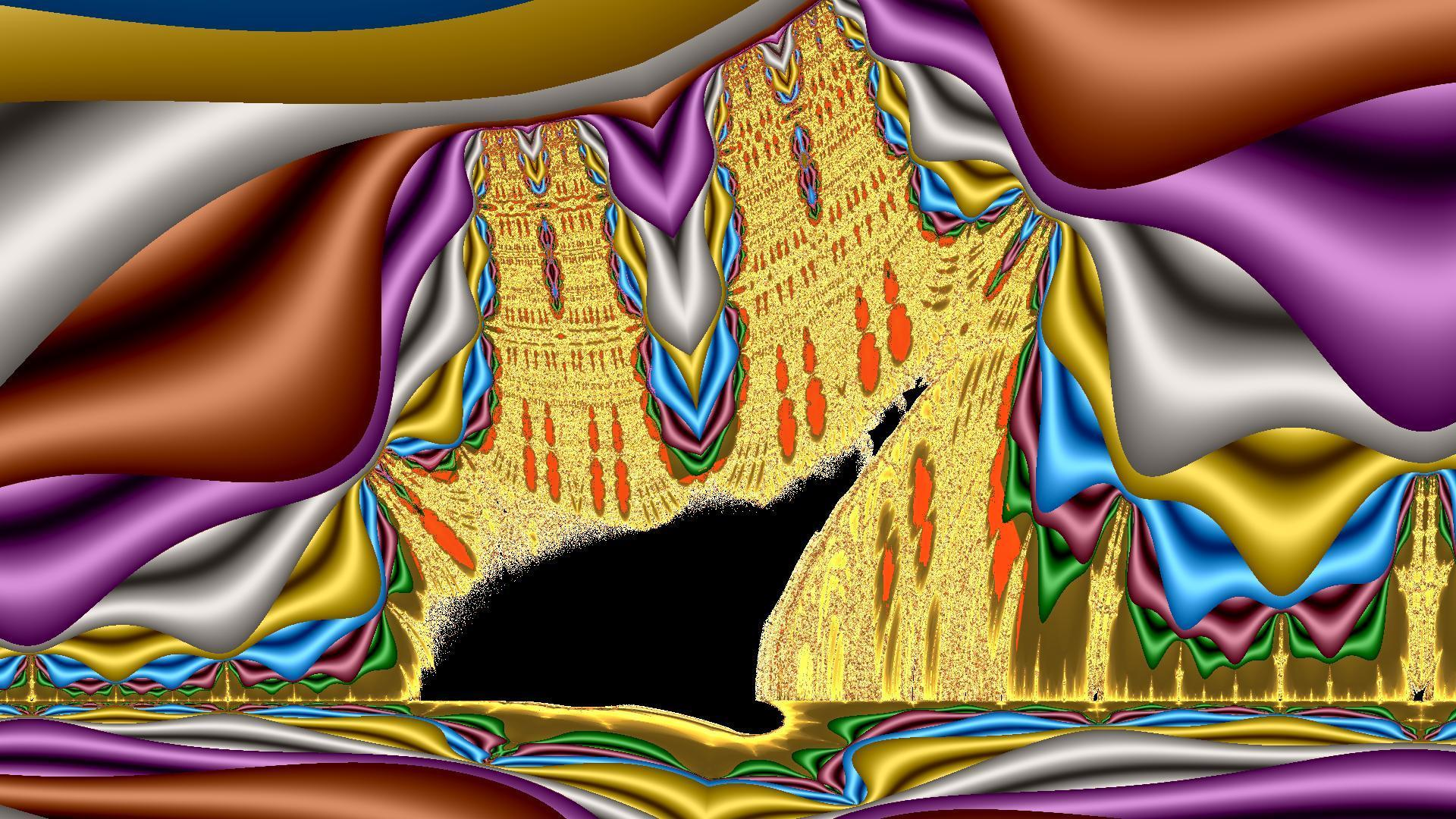
Detail of the Burning Ship fractal

The Burning Ship fractal, first described and created by Michael Michelitsch and Otto E. Rössler in 1992, is generated by iterating the function:

$$z_{n+1} = (|\operatorname{Re} \left(z_n\right)|+i|\operatorname{Im} \left(z_n\right)|)^2 + c, \quad z_0=0$$

in the complex plane $\mathbb{C}$ which will either escape or remain bounded. The difference between this calculation and that for the Mandelbrot set is that the real and imaginary components are set to their respective absolute values before squaring at each iteration. The mapping is non-analytic because its real and imaginary parts do not obey the Cauchy–Riemann equations.

Virtually all images of the Burning Ship fractal are reflected vertically for aesthetic purposes, and some are also reflected horizontally.

== Implementation ==
Animation of a continuous zoom-out to show the amount of detail for an implementation with 64 maximum iterations

The below pseudocode implementation hardcodes the complex operations for Z. Direct complex number operations may optionally be implemented instead.

for each pixel (x, y) on the screen, do:
    x := scaled x coordinate of pixel (scaled to lie in the Mandelbrot X scale (-2.5, 1))
    y := scaled y coordinate of pixel (scaled to lie in the Mandelbrot Y scale (-1, 1))

    zx := x // zx represents the real part of z
    zy := y // zy represents the imaginary part of z 

    iteration := 0
    max_iteration := 100

    while (zx*zx + zy*zy <= 4 and iteration < max_iteration) do
        xtemp := zx*zx - zy*zy + x 
        zy := abs(2*zx*zy) + y // abs returns the absolute value
        zx := xtemp
        iteration := iteration + 1

    if iteration = max_iteration then // Belongs to the set
        return INSIDE_COLOR

    return (max_iteration / iteration) × color // Assign color to pixel outside the set

== Gallery ==
Burning Ship fractal renderings
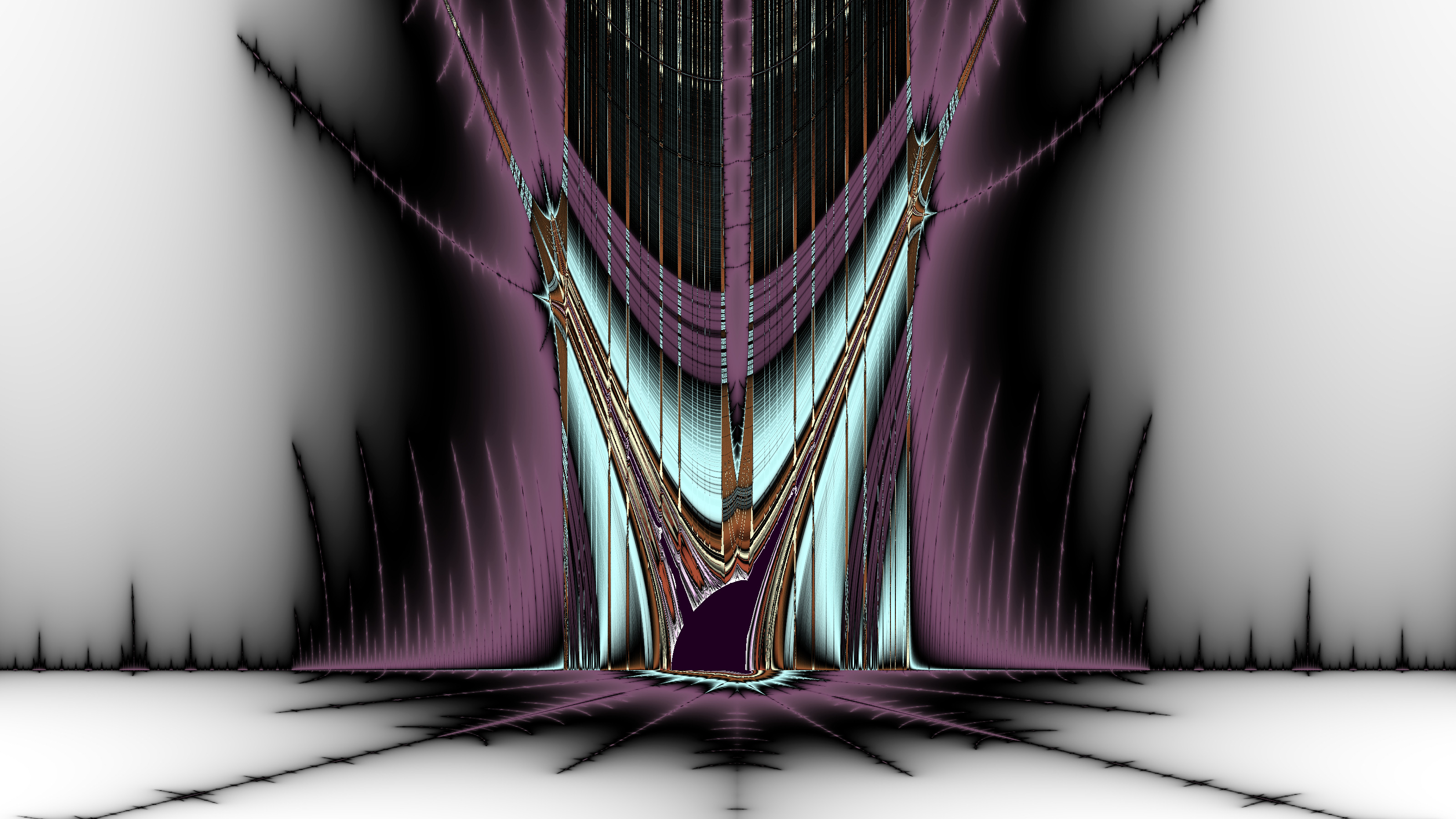
High-quality deep-zoom image of a small ship in the armada in the left Western antenna of the main ship structure

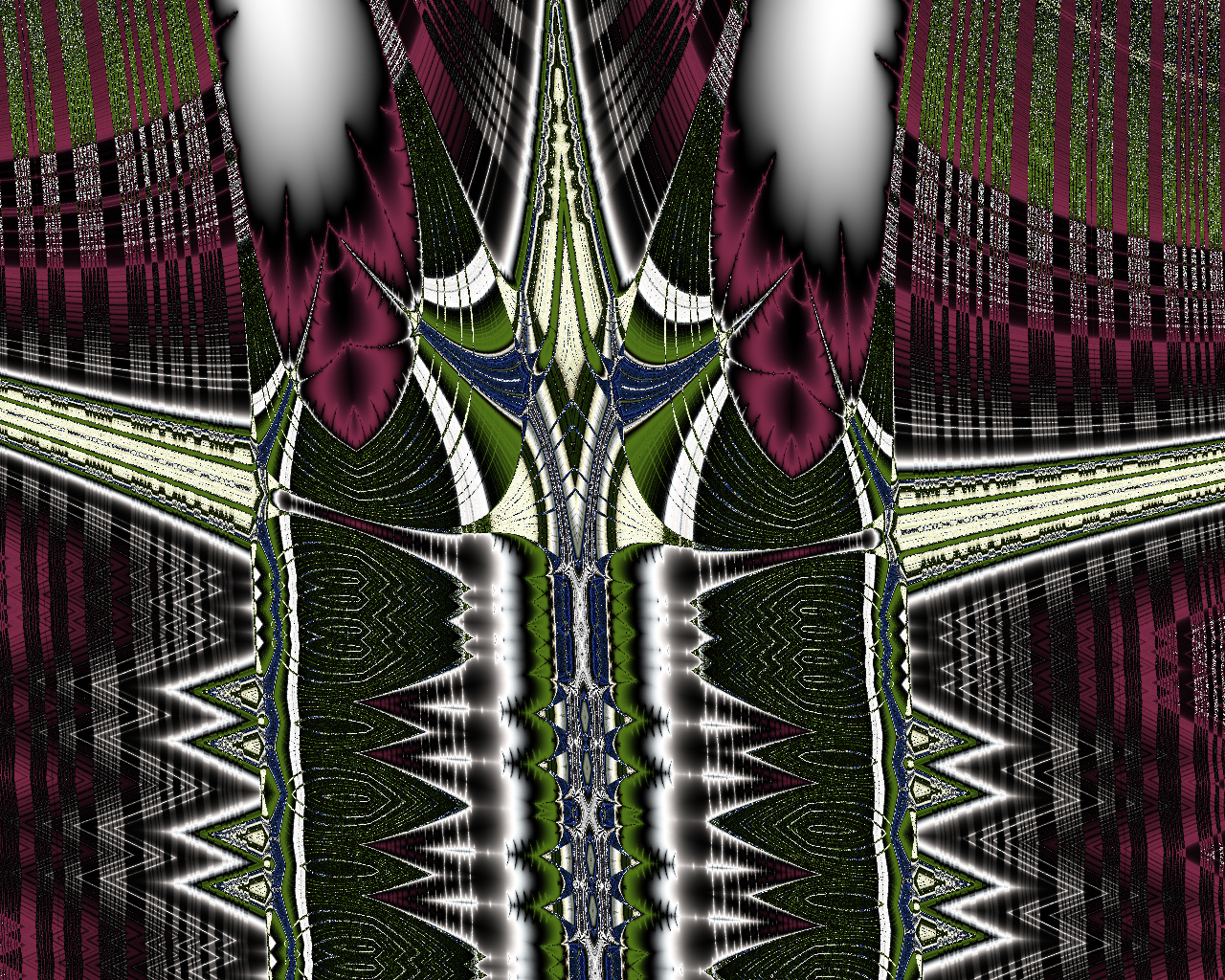
Burning Ship deep zoom to 2.3·10^{−50}

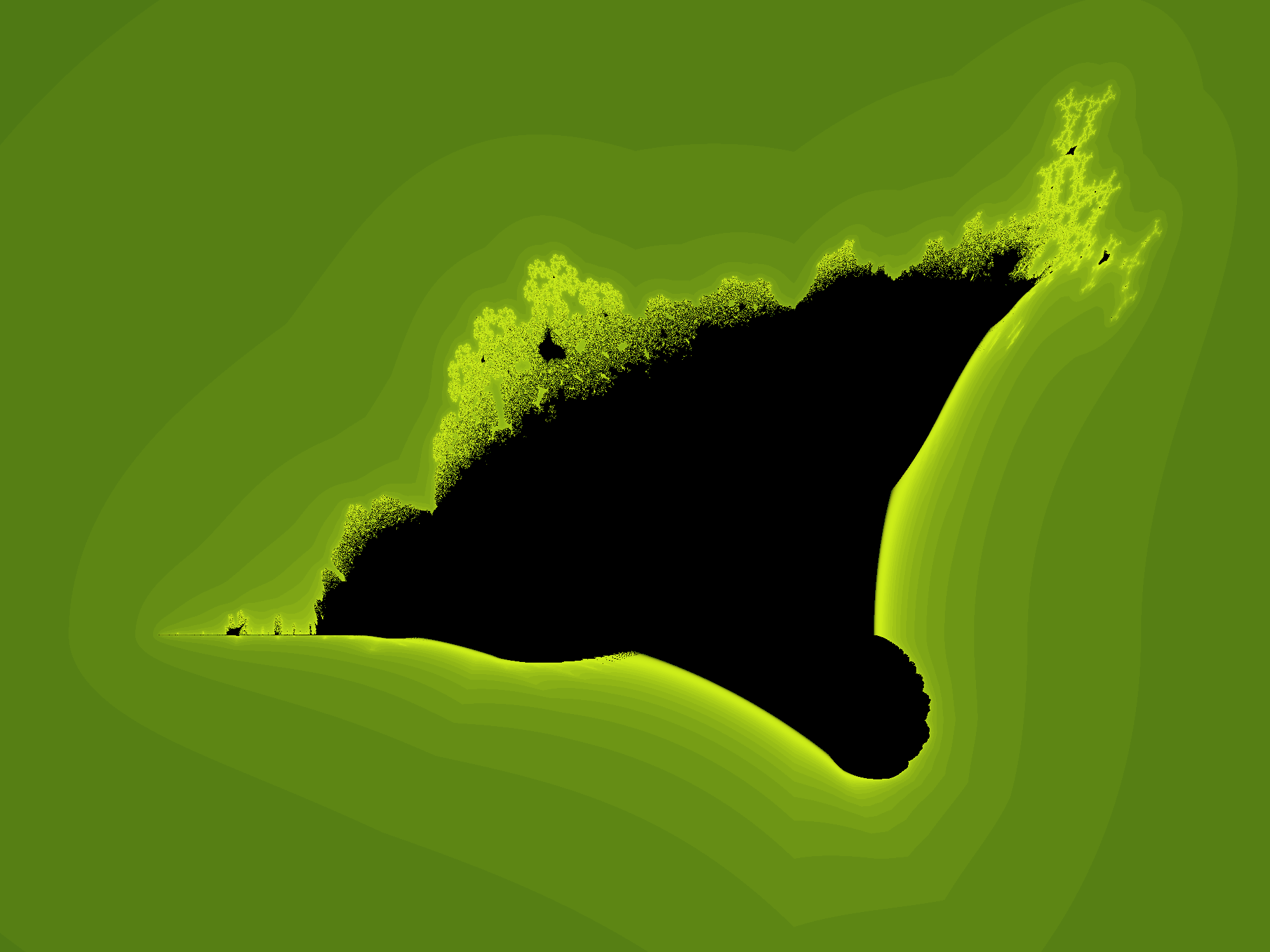
The Burning Ship fractal

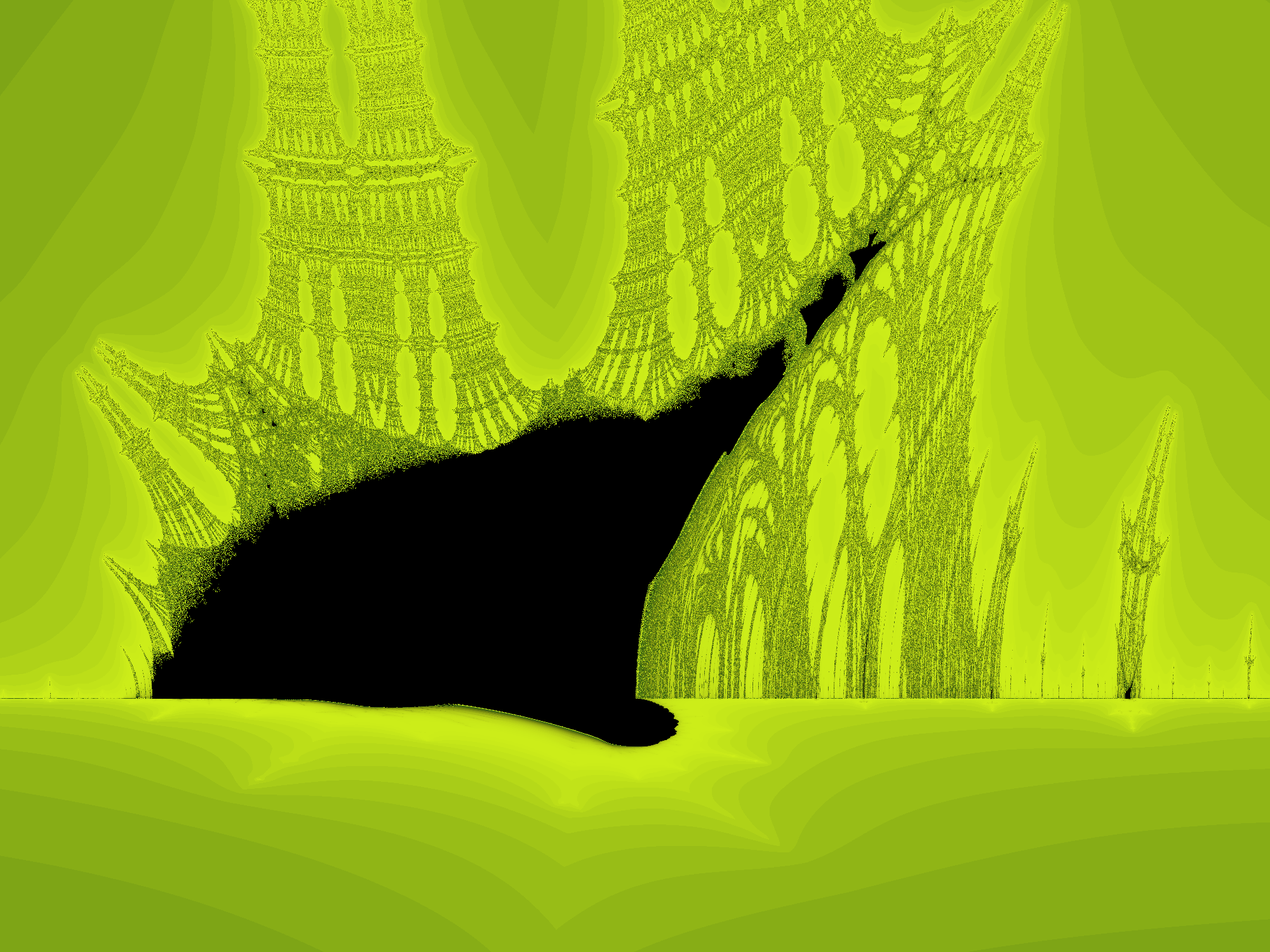
A zoom-in to the lower left of the Burning Ship fractal, showing a "burning ship" and self-similarity to the complete fractal

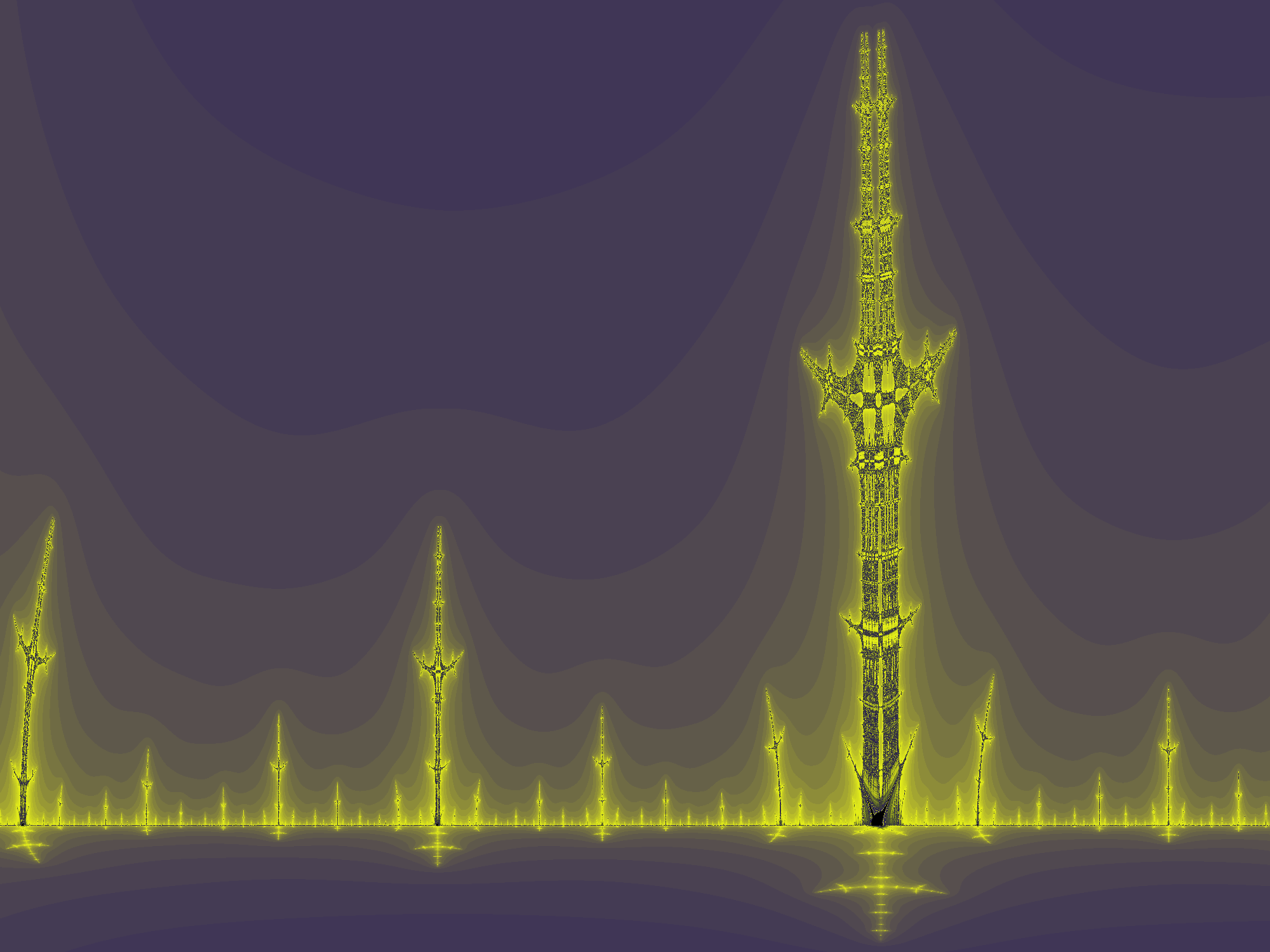
A zoom-in to line on the left of the fractal, showing nested repetition (a different colour scheme is used here)

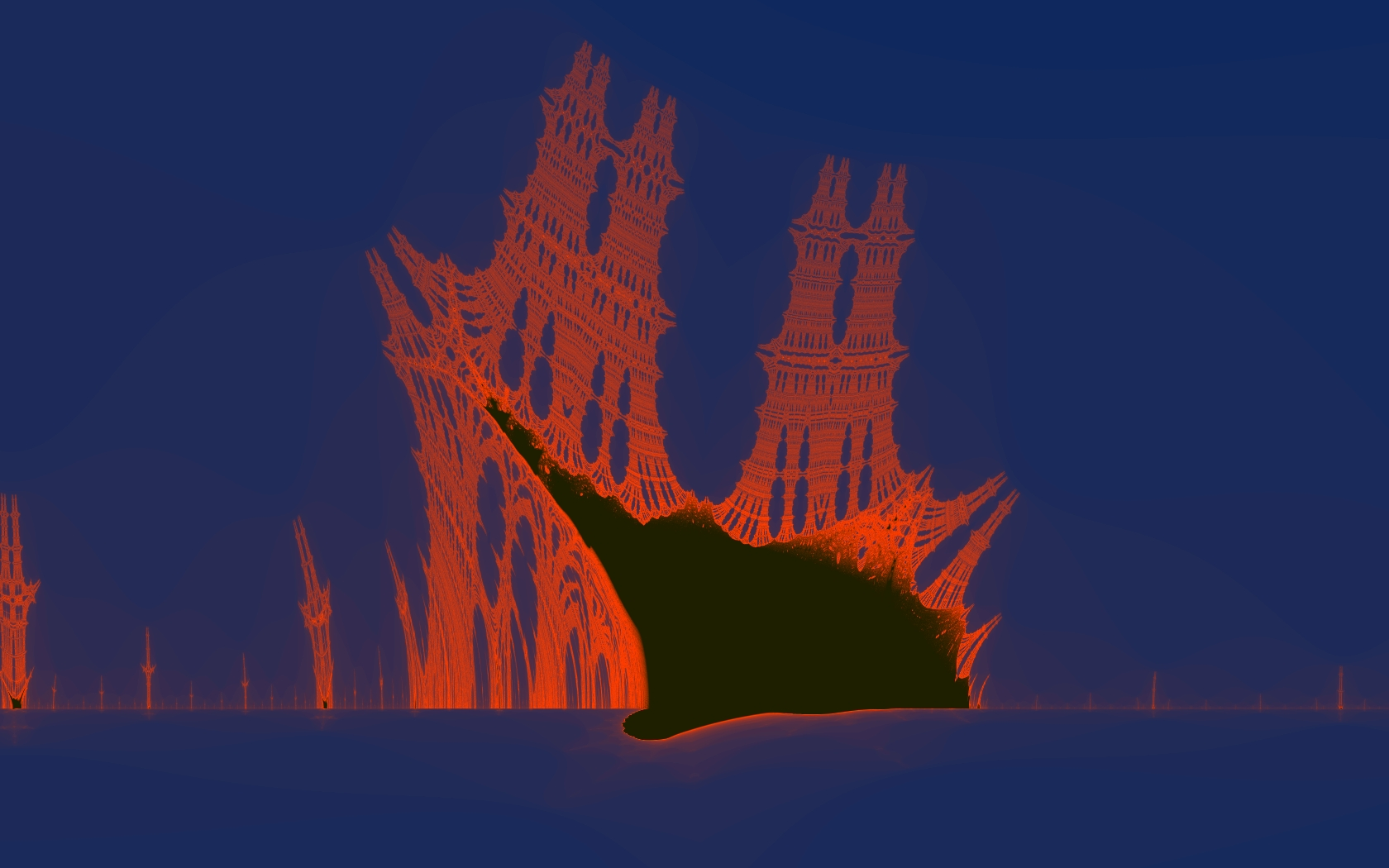
High-quality image of the Burning Ship fractal

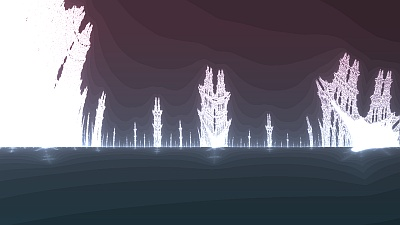
The Burning Ship fractal featured in the 1K intro "JenterErForetrukket" by Youth Uprising; a demoscene production

Ghost Ship - The Burning Ship fractal rendered using the Nebulabrot technique

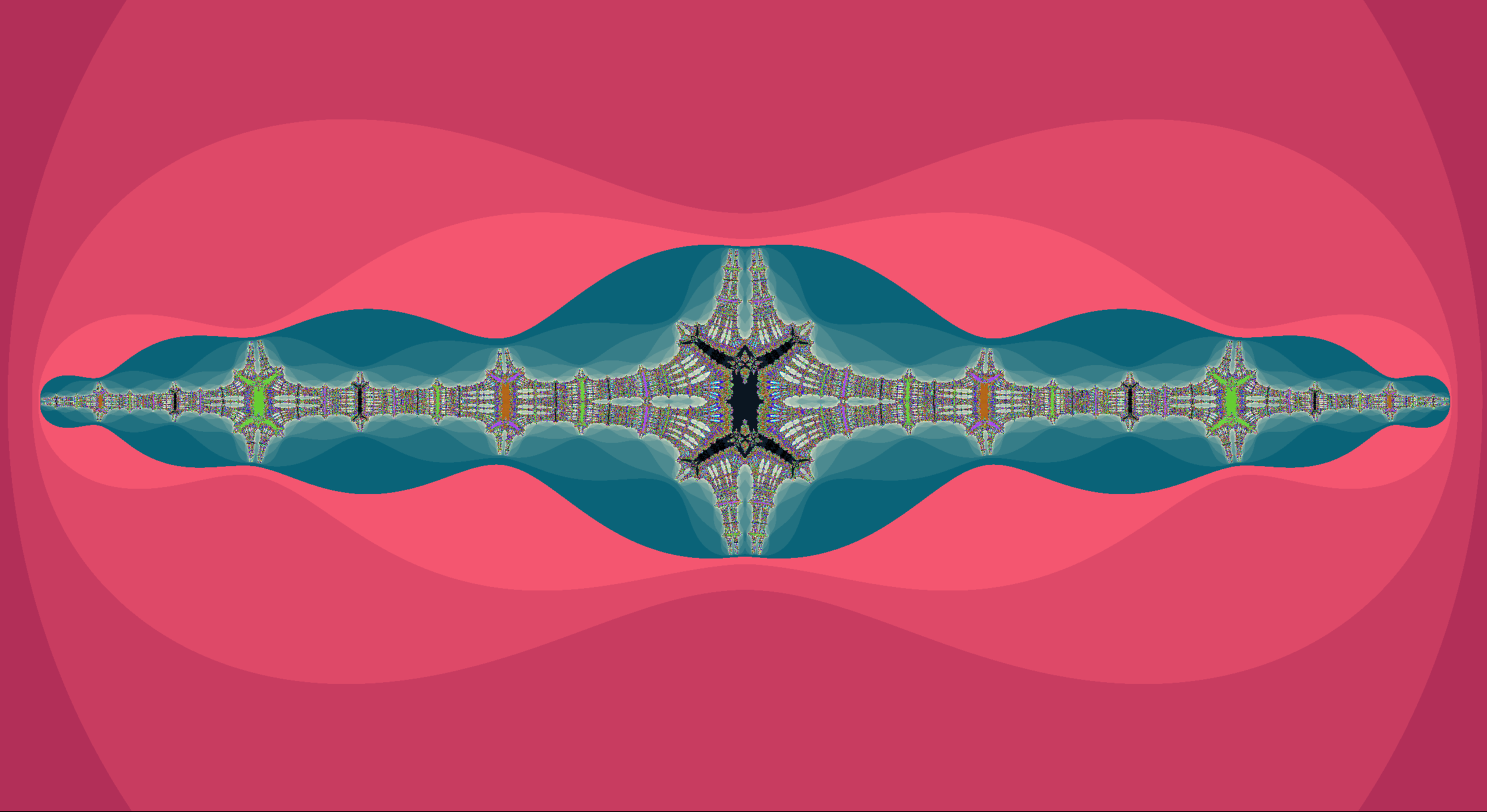
A corresponding Julia set of Burning Ship fractal

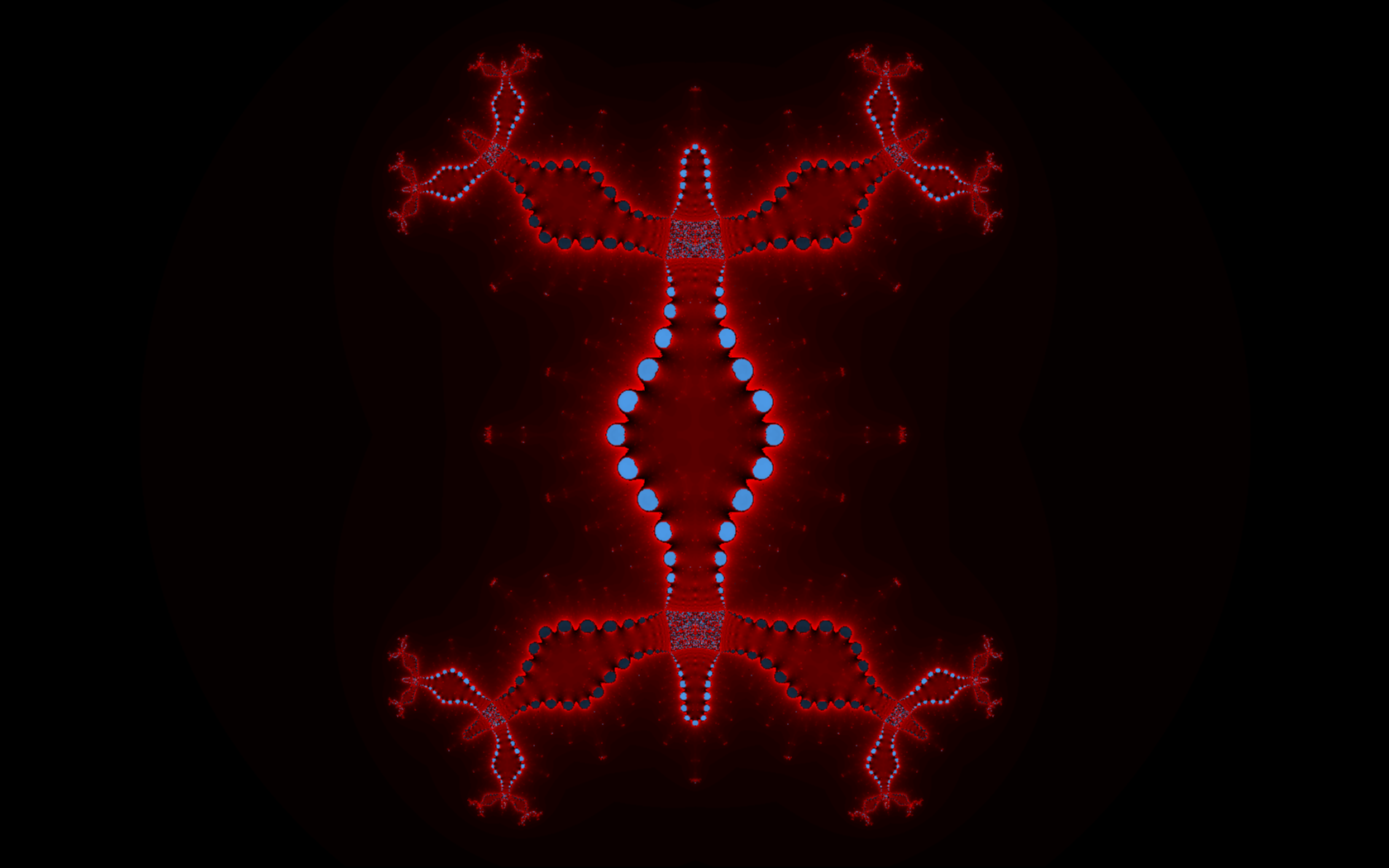
A corresponding Julia set of Burning Ship fractal

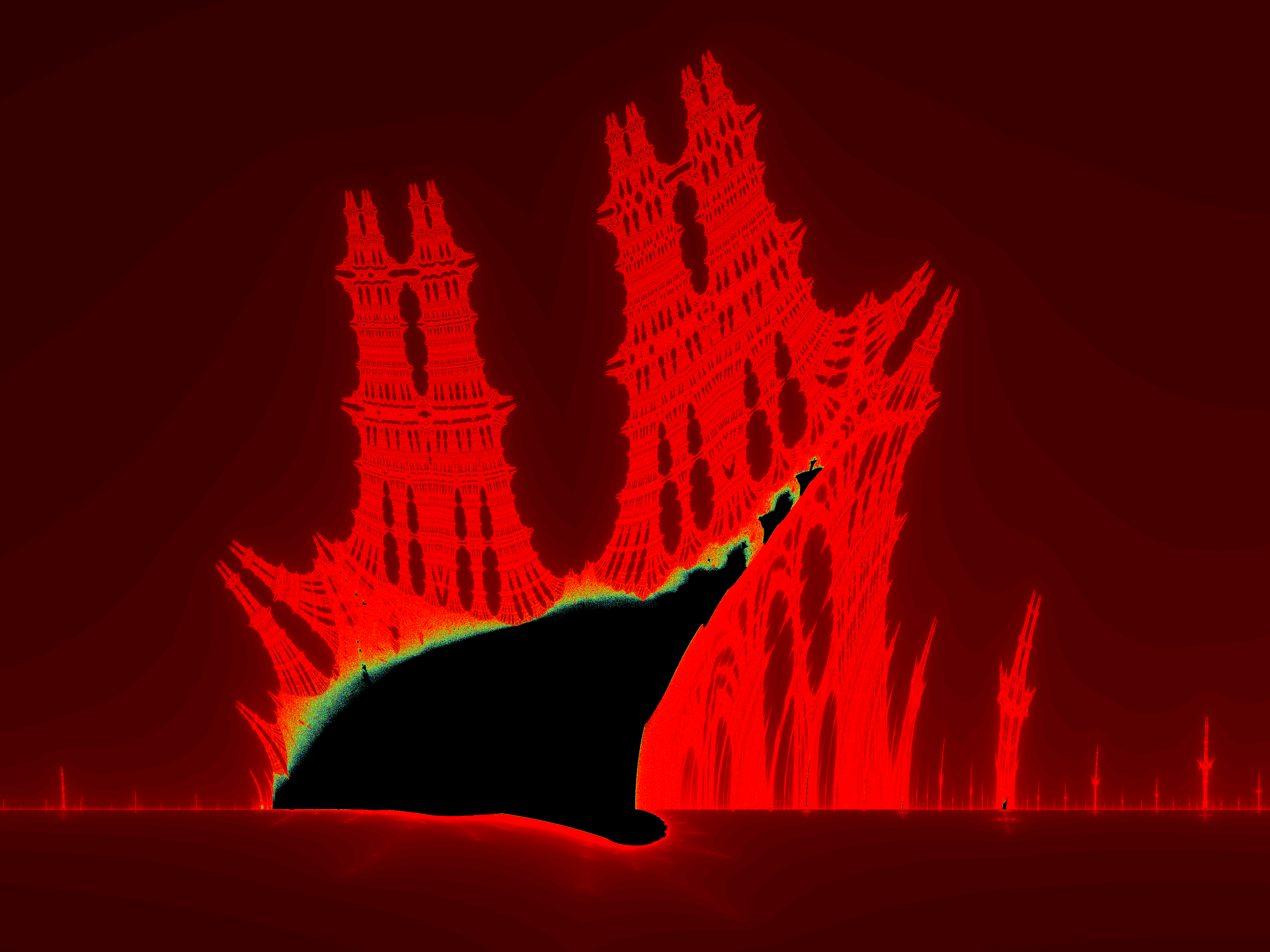
High resolution image of the burning ship fractal

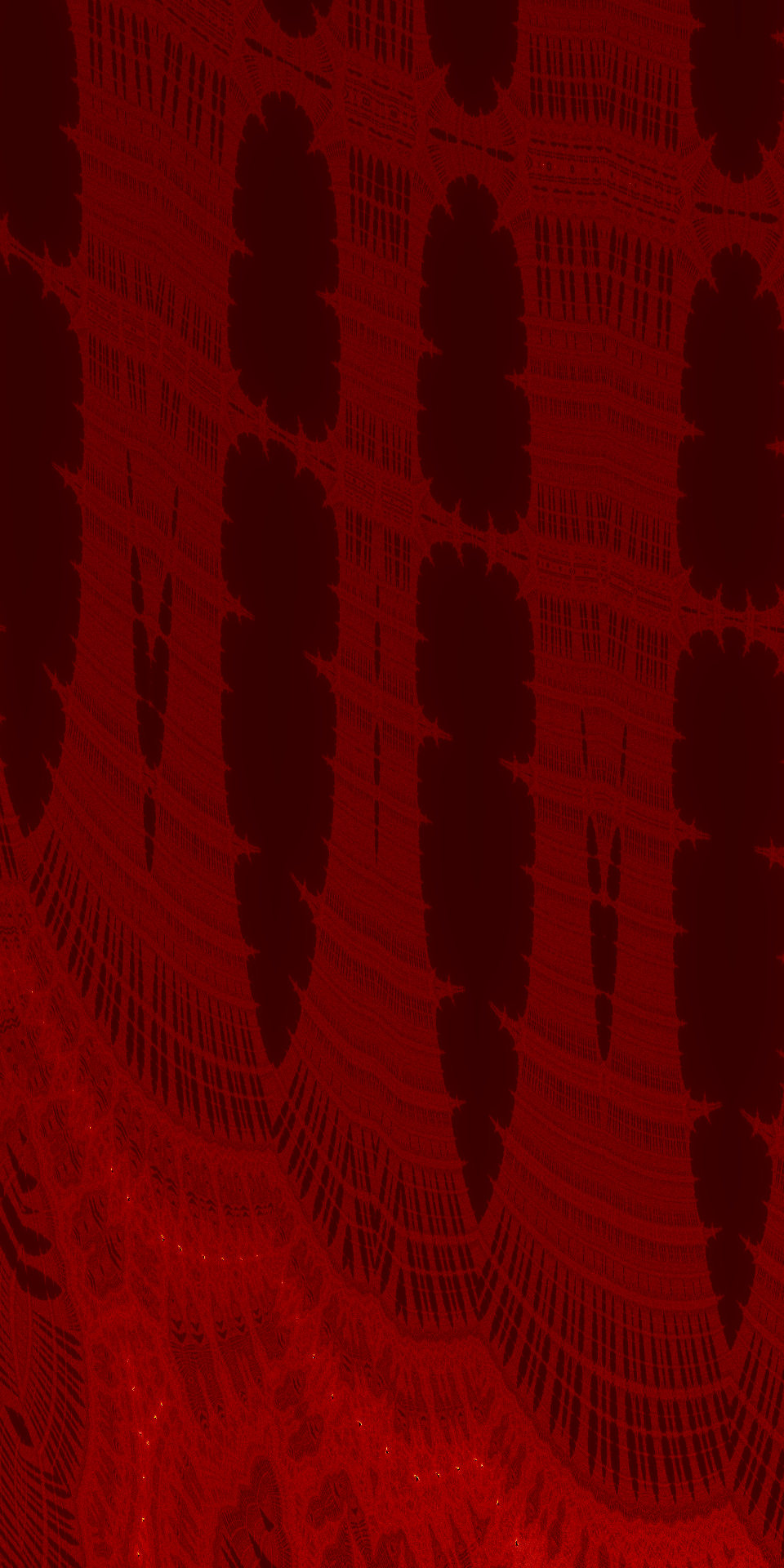
The structure of the Burning Ship fractal

High-quality overview image of the Burning Ship fractal

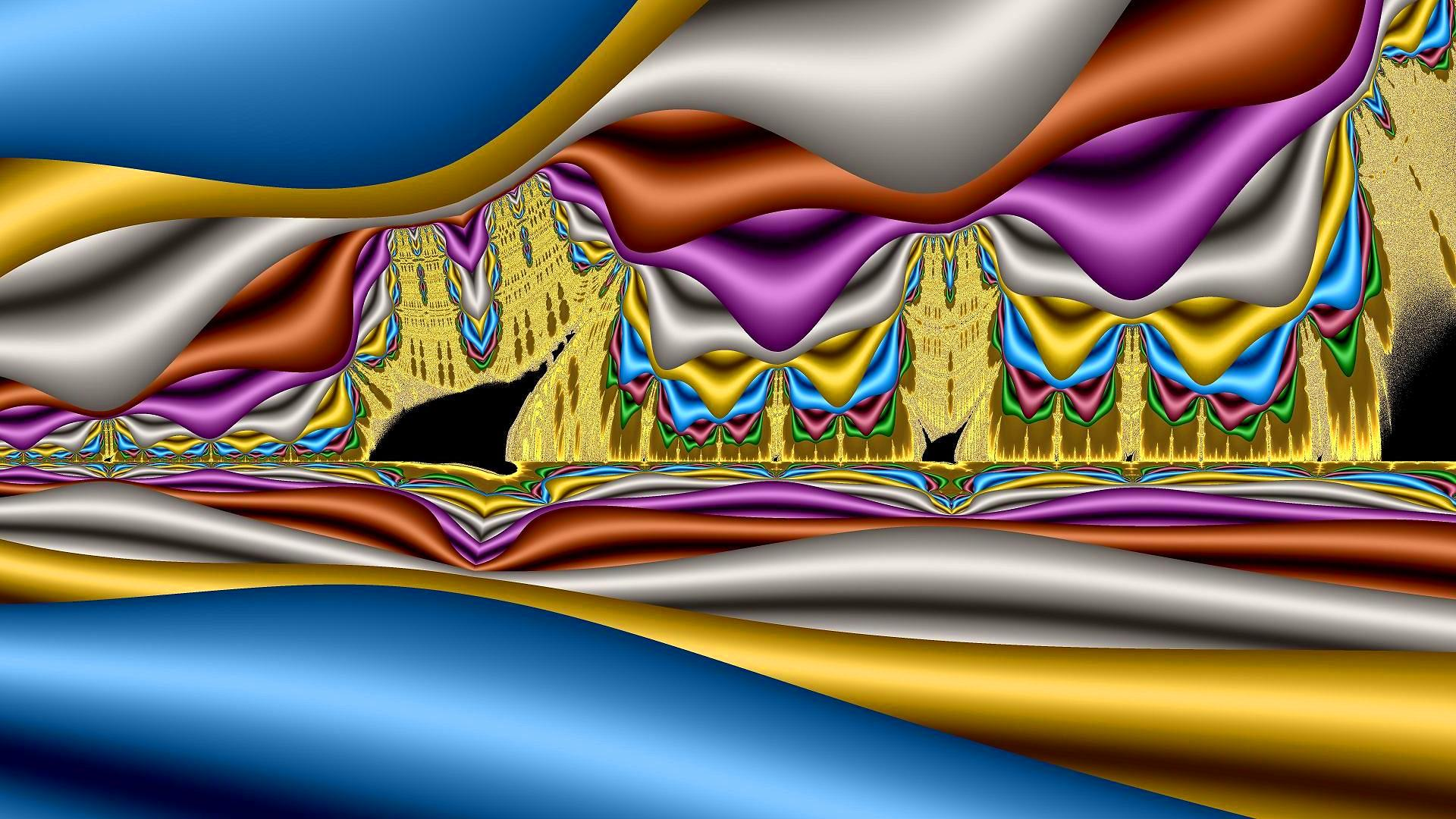
Chain of burning ships

High-quality image of the large ship in the left antenna

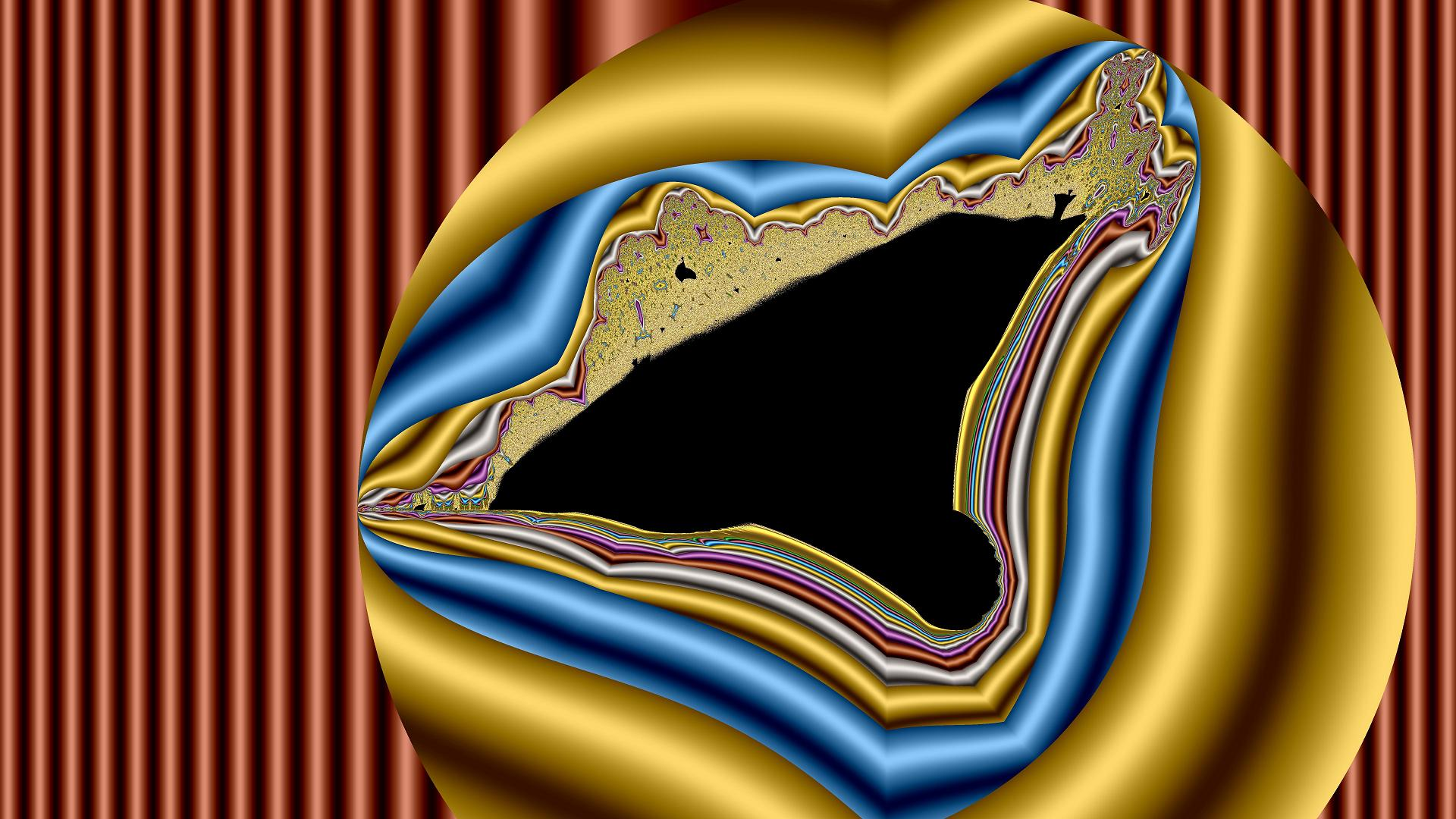
Full fractal
