= Rosser's equation =

In economics, Rosser's equation (named after J. Barkley Rosser, Jr.) calculates future US Social Security Administration Trust Fund balances and payments as the ratio of benefit payments in real terms for a given income level to be received the year after the Trust Fund would be exhausted, to those of the same income level for an initial year.

== Equation ==
(FRA_{ij}(T)/FRA_{ij}(t))·100

where:

$i\,$ refers to projection,
$j\,$ is income level,
$t\,$ is the initial year of an SSA report,
$T\,$ is the time projected for exhaustion of the Trust Fund, and
$FRA\,$ is the real benefit received by someone reaching full retirement age at t or T.

== Usage ==
Rosser's equation was used in Rosser (2005) to make calculations based on given reports and projections. The label was coined by Bruce Webb in 2010, picked up by others, with Webb declaring it as "something between an inside joke and a tribute to Prof. Barkley Rosser, Jr. of James Madison University, an economist friend of mine who pointed out a surprising result: real payable benefits after projected Trust Fund depletion and subsequent 25% cut will still be higher in actual basket of goods terms than those of current retirees,". The most important inputs to the equation are the projections from the SSA Trust Fund reports, which depend on demographic and economic assumptions. In his original discussion in a letter to The Breeze, published 2/14/05, Rosser discussed an informal survey of students in economics classes made by himself and three other professors at JMU regarding their knowledge of what was projected by the SSA to happen after it ran out of "accumulated assets, thereby becoming 'bankrupt.'" They were offered four possible options in terms of the equation, to which they responded by raising their hands, reporting the majority outcomes for the seven classes. "In one class everyone said a), zero. In five classes, a majority said b), between zero and 50%. In one class a majority said c), between 50% and 100%. Among the roughly 250 students not a single one said d), above 100%, the correct answer."
