= Otto Rössler =

German biochemist (1940–2026)

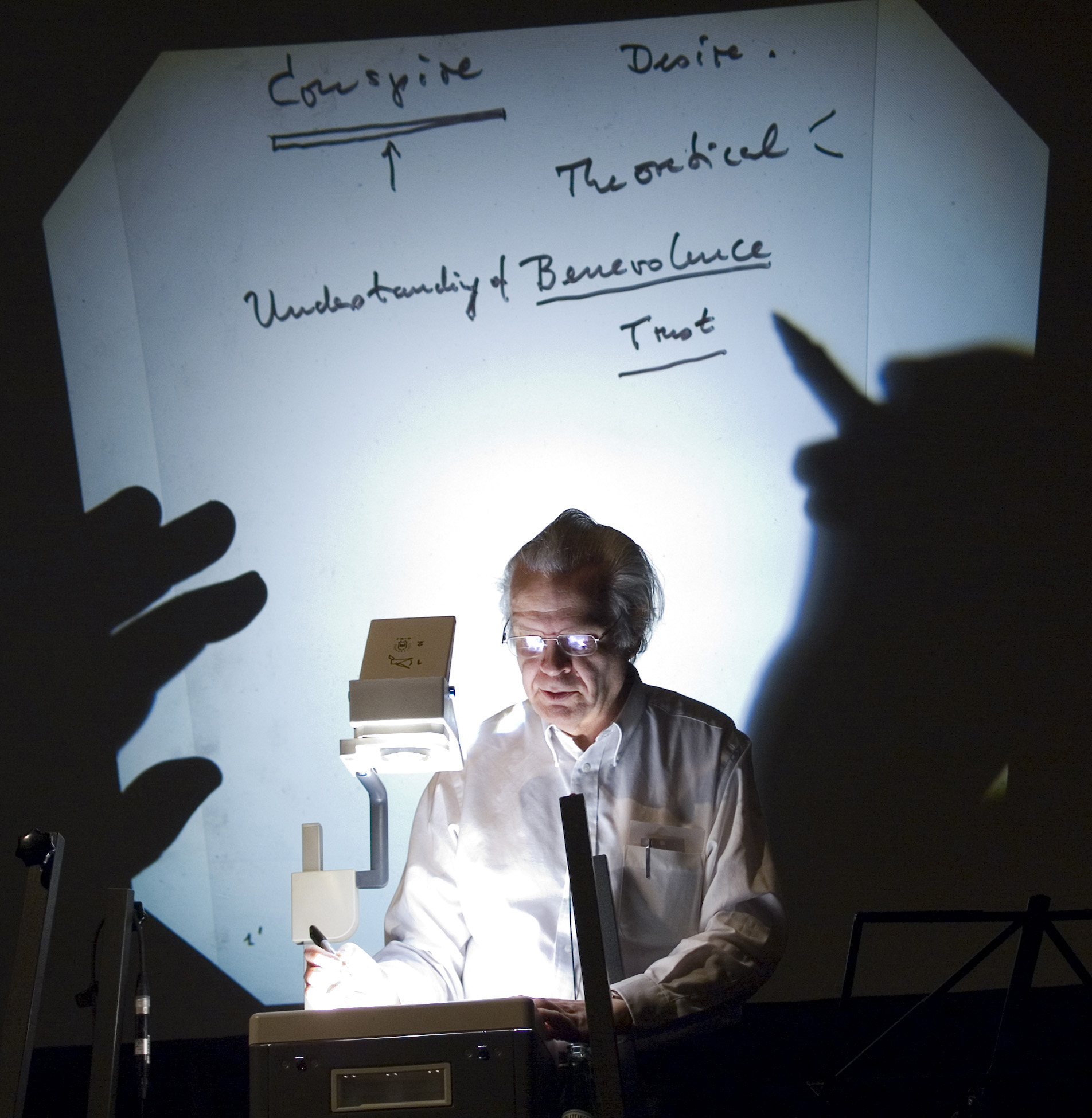
- Rössler at the Transmediale in January 2008
- Born: Otto Eberhard Rössler; 20 May 1940; Berlin, Germany
- Died: 5 October 2026 (aged 86); Tübingen, Germany
- Known for: Rössler attractor; Burning Ship fractal; Chaotic hysteresis; Endophysics; Large Hadron Collider controversy
- Scientific career
- Fields: Biochemistry; Chaos theory
- Workplaces: Max Planck Institute for Behavioral Physiology; SUNY-Buffalo; University of Tübingen

Otto Eberhard Rössler (20 May 1940 – 5 October 2026) was a German interdisciplinary scientist who worked in theoretical biochemistry and nonlinear physics. He was internationally known for his work on chaos theory and the Rössler mathematical model, whose solution most often tend to a strange attractor called Rössler attractor.

Rössler is best known to the general public for his involvement in a failed lawsuit to halt the Large Hadron Collider due to fears that it would generate mini black holes.

== Life and career ==
Rössler was born in Berlin, into an academic family: his father, also named Otto Rössler, was an Austrian Nazi and a scholar of Semitic languages who was affiliated with the Ahnenerbe and later held a professorship at the University of Marburg.

He was awarded his MD in 1966. After postdoctoral studies at the Max Planck Institute for Behavioral Physiology in Bavaria, and a visiting appointment at the Center for Theoretical Biology at SUNY-Buffalo, in 1969 he became Professor for Theoretical Biochemistry at the University of Tübingen. In 1994, he became Professor of Chemistry by decree.

Rössler held visiting positions at the University of Guelph (Mathematics) in Canada, the Center for Nonlinear Studies of the University of California at Los Alamos, the University of Virginia (Chemical Engineering), the Technical University of Denmark (Theoretical Physics), and the Santa Fe Institute (Complexity Research) in New Mexico.

Rössler died on 5 October 2026, at the age of 86.

== Research ==
Rössler authored hundreds of scientific papers in fields as wide-ranging as biogenesis, the origin of language, differentiable automata, chaotic attractors, endophysics, micro relativity, artificial universes, the hypertext encyclopedia, and world-changing technology.

His most heavily cited publication is the 1976 paper in which he studied what is now known as the Rössler attractor, the strange attractor of a system of three differential equations that exhibit chaotic dynamics. Rössler discovered his system after a series of exchanges with Arthur Winfree as detailed by Letellier & Messager (2010). In 2015, Rössler published in Progress in Biophysics and Molecular Biology "a journal article that points not only to a potential cure for autism, but also a means of creating mystical, all-wise elephants".

== Advocacy ==
Rössler and his wife, Reimara, were involved with a long-running series of disputes with their employer, the University of Tübingen, which they accused of discrimination and of violations of academic freedom. In 1988, Reimara Rössler, a professor of medicine, was transferred to a different department within the university; in protest, she began working from home. The state of Baden-Württemberg sued her for failure to perform her assigned duties, as a result of which by 1996 she lost her job and was forced to give up a second home to refund her back pay. Meanwhile, in 1993 and 1994, Otto Rössler had been assigned to teach an introductory chemistry course according to the prescribed curriculum for medical students, but insisted instead on teaching his own material. After he was replaced in the course by another lecturer, he continued trying to give the lectures himself, and was removed by police several times. Because of these incidents, in 1995 a state official tried to force Rössler to undergo psychological tests, but after international protests by many academics this plan was dropped. Rössler continued protesting against his and his wife's treatment by the university and in August 2001 he was caught defacing the university auditorium with spray paint in an attempt to draw attention to his protests.

In June 2008, Rössler publicly criticized the Large Hadron Collider experiment supervised by CERN in Geneva and was involved in a failed lawsuit to halt it. He argued that the experiment could plausibly generate dangerous miniature black holes that could bring about the end of the world. Hermann Nicolai, director of the Max Planck Institute for Gravitational Physics' quantum gravity division, later described Rössler's arguments as being "... based on an elementary misunderstanding of the theory of general relativity".

Rössler was also an honorary editor of the journal Chaos, Solitons & Fractals, which came under fire in 2009 for allegedly publishing papers without as strict peer review as would be expected for a scientific journal. In a subsequent libel suit brought by former journal editor Mohammed El Naschie in response to this criticism, Rössler testified on behalf of El Naschie, stating in court about peer review that "if you have something new to offer, peer review is dangerous", adding that in such cases "peer review delays progress in science".

== Books ==
Rössler was the author or co-author of:

- Encounter with Chaos: Self-Organized Hierarchical Complexity in Semiconductor Experiments (with J. Peinke, J. Parisi, and R. Stoop 1992, Springer-Verlag, 1992, ISBN 0-387-55647-8)
- Das Flammenschwert oder wie hermetisch ist die Schnittstelle des Mikrokonstruktivismus? (in German, Benteli, 1996, ISBN 3-7165-1017-3)
- Interventionen. Vertikale und horizontale Grenzüberschreitung (in German, with René Stettler, Stroemfeld, 1997, ISBN 3-87877-627-6)
- Aussenwelt – Innenwelt – Überwelt. Ein Gespräch (in German, with René Stettler and Peter Weibel, Stroemfeld, 1997, ISBN 3-87877-628-4)
- Endophysics: The World As An Interface (World Scientific, 1998, ISBN 981-02-2752-3)
- Das Denken eines Kindes: Entwicklung, Persönlichkeit, Gefühle (in German, with R. Rössler, Rowohlt, 1998, ISBN 978-3-499-60639-7)
- Medium des Wissens. Das Menschenrecht auf Information (in German, with Artur P. Schmidt, P. Haupt, 2000, ISBN 978-3-258-06021-7)
- Descartes' Traum : von der unendlichen Macht des Außenstehens (Audiobook, in German, Supposé, 2002, ISBN 3-932513-28-2)
- Chaos: The world of nonperiodic oscillations (Springer, 2020, ISBN 978-3-030-44304-7) Chaos
