= Chaotic hysteresis =

A nonlinear dynamical system exhibits chaotic hysteresis if it simultaneously exhibits chaotic dynamics (chaos theory) and hysteresis. As the latter involves the persistence of a state, such as magnetization, after the causal or exogenous force or factor is removed, it involves multiple equilibria for given sets of control conditions. Such systems generally exhibit sudden jumps from one equilibrium state to another (sometimes amenable to analysis using catastrophe theory). If chaotic dynamics appear either prior to or just after such jumps, or are persistent throughout each of the various equilibrium states, then the system is said to exhibit chaotic hysteresis. Chaotic dynamics are irregular and bounded and subject to sensitive dependence on initial conditions.

== Background and applications ==
The term was introduced initially by Ralph Abraham and Christopher Shaw (1987), but was modeled conceptually earlier and has been applied to a wide variety of systems in many disciplines. The first model of such a phenomenon was due to Otto Rössler in 1983, which he viewed as applying to major brain dynamics, and arising from three-dimensional chaotic systems. In 1986 it was applied to electric oscillators by Newcomb and El-Leithy, perhaps the most widely used application since (see also Pecora and Carroll, 1990).

The first to use the term for a specific application was J. Barkley Rosser, Jr. in 1991, who suggested that it could be applied to explaining the process of systemic economic transition, with Poirot (2001) following up on this in regard to the Russian financial crisis of 1998. Empirical analysis of the phenomenon in the Russian economic transition was done by Rosser, Rosser, Guastello, and Bond (2001). While he did not use the term, Tönu Puu (1989) presented a multiplier-accelerator business cycle model with a cubic accelerator function that exhibited the phenomenon.

Other conscious applications of the concept have included to Rayleigh-Bénard convection rolls, hysteretic scaling for ferromagnetism, and a pendulum on a rotating table (Berglund and Kunz, 1999), to induction motors (Súto and Nagy, 2000), to combinatorial optimization in integer programming (Wataru and Eitaro, 2001), to isotropic magnetization (Hauser, 2004), to bursting oscillations in beta cells in the pancreas and population dynamics (Françoise and Piquet, 2005), to thermal convection (Vadasz, 2006), and to neural networks (Liu and Xiu, 2007).
