= Mohamed El Naschie =

Egyptian engineer and editor

Mohamed El Naschie (Arabic: محمد النشائي; born 1943) is an Egyptian engineer and the former editor of the controversial journal Chaos, Solitons & Fractals. The controversy concerned El Naschie's publication, over many years, of over 300 papers of questioned scientific merit authored by himself with little or no apparent peer review. Published reports of his eventual departure from the journal's editorship led to a lengthy libel court case that raised questions about the libel laws in Great Britain. The controversy has also played a role in discussions of the "impact factor" as a quality measure for scientific journals and of the methodology of university rankings.

== Early life and education ==
El Naschie grew up in Germany. His initial training was as an engineer; he received an engineering degree from Leibniz University Hannover. He later studied in England and was awarded a doctorate by the University of London in 1974, with a thesis entitled "The roll of formulation in elastic buckling" [sic].

== Publications ==
Between 1974 and 1990 El Naschie published eight papers, mainly relating to the mathematics of buckling, in the Journal of Applied Mathematics and Mechanics. Since then he has published over 400 articles, mainly in the field of theoretical physics, the majority in Chaos, Solitons & Fractals, a journal of which he was the editor-in-chief, and where standards of peer review have been questioned.

The majority of El Naschie's later publications concern his own controversial E-infinity theory that the universe has an infinite number of dimensions and is based on a Cantor continuum. Mathematical physicist professor John C. Baez of the University of California, Riverside has called El Naschie's work "undisciplined numerology filled with impressive buzzwords", while cosmologist Neil Turok of the Perimeter Institute, testifying as an expert witness against El Naschie in a British court case, has strongly criticized the quality of El Naschie's papers, based on criteria such as the occurrence of meaningless or obscure statements, wrong statements, and the lack of any substantial contribution of new knowledge to the field concerned. In 2002, El Naschie was awarded a Fellowship by the Frankfurter Förderverein für Physikalische Grundlagenforschung, a private organisation devoted to supporting research, in appreciation of his "original ideas in developing a theory of fractal space-time allowing the determination of the basic constants of nature".

== Chaos, Solitons & Fractals ==
At the end of the 1980s, chaos theory and fractal mathematics were in fashion, and El Naschie wished to apply these concepts to engineering. In 1991 El Naschie founded the scientific journal Chaos, Solitons & Fractals, initially with the British publisher Pergamon Press. When Pergamon was sold, the journal passed to the Elsevier stable. He served as its editor-in- hief until his retirement in 2009. El Naschie published over 300 of his own papers in the journal, and this extremely high rate of self-publication by the editor-in-chief led to charges that normal standards of peer review were not upheld at the journal. Peter Woit of Columbia University was quoted as saying "it's plain obvious that there was either zero, or at best very poor, peer review, of his own papers". El Naschie has said "Senior people are above this childish, vain practice of peer review." Otto Rössler, an honorary editor of the journal and a biochemist best known for his involvement in a failed lawsuit to halt the Large Hadron Collider due to fears that it would generate mini black holes, stated in British court testimony that "if you have something new to offer, peer review is dangerous" and "delays progress in science". The journal also had a high level of self-citation, which increased its impact factor.

== Nature libel case ==
In 2008, the journal Nature published a news article by Quirin Schiermeier alleging that some of El Naschie's papers did not appear to be properly peer-reviewed and that he claimed institutional affiliations that could not be confirmed. El Naschie disputed these allegations and sued Nature for libel. In July 2012 the case was dismissed, with the judge ruling that the article was "substantially true", contained "honest comment" and was "the product of responsible journalism". The judgement noted that El Naschie, who represented himself in court, had failed to provide any documentary evidence that his papers had been peer-reviewed. Judge Victoria Sharp also found "reasonable and serious grounds" for suspecting that El Naschie used a range of false names to defend his editorial practice in communications with Nature and described this behavior as "curious" and "bizarre".

== University ranking controversy ==
El Naschie's practice of publishing a great number of articles in a journal of which he himself was the editor also came to public attention when it was identified as a crucial contributing factor for propelling Alexandria University into the top group of the Times Higher Education magazine's university rankings. This evidence of such rankings being easily skewed has led to criticism of the methodology of university rankings in general.
