= List of neutron stars =

Astronomical objects

Zooming to RX J1856.5−3754 which is one of the Magnificent Seven and, at a distance of about 400 light-years, the closest-known neutron star

Neutron stars are the collapsed cores of supergiant stars. They are created as a result of supernovas and gravitational collapse, and are the second-smallest and densest class of stellar objects. In the cores of these stars, protons and electrons combine to form neutrons. Neutron stars can be classified as pulsars if they are magnetized, if they rotate, and if they emit beams of electromagnetic radiation out of their magnetic poles. They may include soft gamma repeaters (SGR) and radio-quiet neutron stars, as well as pulsars such as radio pulsars, recycled pulsars, low mass X-ray pulsars, and accretion-powered pulsars. A notable grouping of neutron stars includes the Magnificent Seven.

== List of neutron stars ==
List of neutron stars
Designation	Type	Constellation	Right ascension	Declination	Distance (pc)	Mass (M☉)	Radius (km)	Spin period (sec)	Temperature (K)	Notes
SGR 1806−20	Magnetar	Sagittarius	18h 08m 39.32s	−20° 24' 39.5"	13,000			7.55592		
RCW 103	Radio-quiet	Norma	16h 17m 33.000s	−51° 02' 00.00"	3,100-3,300					
1RXS J141256.0+792204 (Calvera)	Radio-quiet	Ursa Minor	14h 12m 55.867s	+79° 22' 03.895"	≤2,000			0.059199071070		
RX J0822−4300 ("Cosmic Cannonball")	Radio-quiet	Puppis	08h 23m 8.16s	−42° 41′ 41.4″	2,000					
PSR B1937+21	Pulsar	Vulpecula	19h 39m 38.560210s	+21° 34′ 59.14166″	>3,600			0.0015578065		
RX J1856.5−3754		Corona Australis	18h 56m 35s	−37° 54′ 36″	122	1.5	12.1			The Magnificent Seven
RBS1556										The Magnificent Seven
RBS1223										The Magnificent Seven
RX J0720.4−3125		Canis Major	07h 20m 24.961s	−31° 25′ 50.21″	360		4.50 - 5.38			The Magnificent Seven
RX J0420.0-5022										The Magnificent Seven
PSR B1937+21	Pulsar	Vulpecula	19h 39m 38.560210s	+21° 34′ 59.14166″	3,600			0.0015578065		First-discovered millisecond pulsar
PSR B1957+20 (The Black Widow pulsar)	Eclipsing binary pulsar	Sagitta	19h 59m 36.77s	+20° 48′ 15.12″	2000	1.66 - 1.8		0.00160734		
PSR B0531+21 (The Crab Pulsar)	Pulsar	Taurus	05h 34m 31.95s	+22° 00′ 52.2″	1,900		10	0.0335028583		
PSR B1509−58	Pulsar	Circinus	15h 13m 55.52s	−59° 08′ 08.8″	5,200 ±1,400		9.5	0.1502		
PSR B0329+54	Pulsar	Camelopardalis	03h 32m 59.368s	+54° 34′ 43.57″	1,060			0.71452		
PSR B0943+10	Pulsar	Leo	09h 46m 7.31s	+09° 51′ 57.3″	630 ±100	1.5		1.1	3,100,000	
PSR B1257+12 (Lich)	Pulsar	Virgo	13h 00m 01s	+12° 40′ 57″	710 ±40			0.006219		Host to the first-discovered extrasolar and pulsar planets
PSR B1620−26	Pulsar	Scorpius	16h 23m 38.2218s	−26° 31′ 53.769"	3,800	1.35	20.85		≤ 30,000	Binary with a white dwarf
PSR B1828−11	Pulsar	Scutum	18h 30m 47.75s	−10° 59′ 10.8″	3,200					
PSR B1919+21 (LGM-1, Little Green Men)	Pulsar	Vulpecula	19h 21m 44.815s	+21° 53′ 02.25"	100-1100	1.4	9.7	1.3373		First-discovered radio pulsar
PSR J0348+0432	Pulsar	Taurus	03h 48m 43.639s	+04° 32′ 11.458″	2,100	2.01	13 ±2	0.0391226569017806		Binary with a white dwarf
PSR J0737−3039A	Double pulsar	Puppis	07h 37m 51.248s	−30° 39′ 40.83″	1150	1.338		0.022699379740922		First-known double pulsar
PSR J0737−3039B	Double pulsar	Puppis	07h 37m 51.248s	−30° 39′ 40.83″	1150	1.249		2.7734613485		First-known double pulsar
PSR J0740+6620	Pulsar	Camelopardalis	07h 40m 45.799s	+66° 20′ 33.60″	1,410	2.08	12.39			Binary with a white dwarf
PSR J0952–0607	Black Widow Pulsar	Sextans	09h 52m 08.319s	−06° 07′ 23.49″	970, 1720, or 6260	2.35		0.00141379836		Fastest spinning pulsar known within the Milky Way
PSR J1311–3430	Pulsar	Centaurus	13h 11m 45.724s	−34° 30′ 30.35″		2.7		0.0025		
PSR J1614−2230	Pulsar	Scorpius	16h 14m 36.5051s	−22° 30′ 31.081″	1,200	1.908	13 ±2	0.0031508076534271		Binary with a white dwarf
PSR J1719−1438	Pulsar	Serpens	17:19:10.0730(1)	−14:38:00.96(2)	1,200	1.4	19	0.0058		
PSR J1748-2021B	Pulsar	Virgo	17h 48m 52.9522s	−20h 21m 38.90s	223	2.548				
PSR J1946+2052A	Pulsar	Vulpecula	19h 46m 14.130s	+20° 52′ 24.64″	3500 - 4200	<1.31		0.0169601753230		
PSR J1946+2052A	Neutron star	Vulpecula	19h 46m 14.130s	+20° 52′ 24.64″	3500 - 4200	>1.18				
PSR J2124−3358	Pulsar	Microscopium	21h 24m 43.8464s	−33° 58′ 44.961″	270					
PSR J0835-4510 (The Vela Pulsar)	Pulsar	Vela	08h 35m 20.65525s	−45° 10′ 35.1545″	294			0.08933		
3XMM J004232.1+411314	Low-mass x-ray binary pulsar	Andromeda	00h 42m 32.072s	+41° 13' 14.33'		<3.0		3		Most luminous known x-ray source with dips in its x-ray light curves
PSR J0337+1715	Pulsar	Taurus	03h 37m 43.82589s	+17° 15′ 14.8280″	4200	1.436		0.0027325886324400003		Hierarchical system with two white dwarfs and one candidate pulsar planet.

=== Anomalous X-ray pulsars ===
- Anomalous X-ray pulsar (AXP)
- AXP 1E 1048-59
- AXP 1E2259+586
- AXP4U 0142+61
- AXP 1RXS 1708–40
- AXP 1E 1841–045
- AXP AXJ1844-0258
- AXP CXJ0110-7211
- Vela X-1
- 4U 0352+309
- Bursting Pulsar
- Vela Junior
- LMC N49

== Binary star systems ==
- Intermediate-mass X-ray binary
- High-mass X-ray binaries
- Centaurus X-3
- Circinus X-1
- GX 301-2
- Hercules X-1

== Related objects ==
- Kesteven 79
- PSR B1620−26 b
- 3C 58
- Cas X-1
- GW170817
- Cygnus Loop
- Spaghetti Nebula
- SN 1987A
- Jellyfish Nebula

== See also ==
- Stellar designations and names
