= List of most massive neutron stars =

Neutron stars are the gravitational collapsed core of massive stars (9-10 solar masses) that have gone supernova. They are some of the densest objects in the universe only being surpassed by black holes. They generally have masses in the order of 1.5 solar masses compact into an area of just 12 kilometers. Currently the most massive neutron star that has been discovered is PSR J1748-2021B which has a mass of 2.5 solar masses.

Below is a list of high-mass neutron stars.

Name	Mass (M_{☉})	Distance (ly)	Companion class	Mass determination method	Notes	Refs.
PSR J1748-2021B	2.548+0.047 −0.078	27,700	D	Rate of advance of periastron.	In globular cluster NGC 6440.	
4U 1700-37	2.44±0.27	6,910 ± 1,120	O6.5Iaf^{+}	Monte Carlo simulations of thermal comptonization process.	HMXB system.	
PSR J2017-1614	2.4±0.6	4,570	Substellar object		Black widow pulsar, in a tight 2.3 hour binary.	
PSR J0952–0607	2.35±0.17	3,200–5,700	Substellar object	Radio-measured Shapiro delay	Black widow pulsar. Fastest spinning galactic pulsar.	
PSR J1311–3430	2.15–2.7	6,500–12,700	Substellar object	Spectroscopic and photometric observation.	Black widow pulsar.	
PSR J1600−3053	2.3+0.7 −0.6	6,500 ± 1,000	D	Fourier analysis of Shapiro delay's orthometric ratio.		
PSR J2215+5135	2.27+0.17 −0.15	10,000	G5V	Innovative measurement of companion's radial velocity.	Redback pulsar.	
XMMU J013236.7+303228	2.2+0.8 −0.6	2,730,000	B1.5IV	Detailed spectroscopic modelling.	In M33, HMXB system.	
PSR J0751+1807	2.10±0.2	6,500 ± 1,300	D	Precision pulse timing measurements of relativistic orbital decay.		
PSR J0740+6620	2.08±0.07	4,600	D	Range and shape parameter of Shapiro delay.	Most massive neutron star with a well-constrained mass.	
PSR J0348+0432	2.01±0.04	2,100	D	Spectroscopic observation and orbital decay due to radiation of gravitational waves.		
PSR J1518+0204B (M5B)	1.981	24,500	M6-8V?		In the globular cluster, M5. In a 7 day binary with a low-mass 0.11-0.13 M_{☉} red dwarf.	
PSR B1516+02B	1.94+0.17 −0.19	24,500	D	Rate of advance of periastron.	In globular cluster M5.	
PSR J1614−2230	1.908±0.016	3,900	D	Range and shape parameter of Shapiro delay.	In Milky Way's galactic disk.	
Vela X-1	1.88±0.13	6,200 ± 650	B0.5Ib	Rate of advance of periastron.	Prototypical detached HMXB system.	
PSR J2222–0137	1.831	871	D		Companion is a white dwarf which is one of the most massive at 1.319 M_{☉}	
PSR B1957+20	1.81±0.17	6,500	Substellar object	Rate of advance of periastron.	Prototype star of black widow pulsars.	
SWIFT J1756.9-2508	1.8±0.4	26,100	Substellar object		Hosts one planet, it is notable for orbiting its star in 54 minutes.	

== See also ==
- Blitzar
- List of least massive black holes
- List of most massive black holes
- List of lower mass gap objects
- List of neutron stars
- Tolman–Oppenheimer–Volkoff limit
- Quark star
