= Central compact object =

Faint neutron star at the center of a supernova remnant

A central compact object (CCO) is an x-ray source found near the center of a young, nearby supernova remnant (SNR). Given the x-ray flux and spectra of these compact objects, the almost certain conclusion is that CCOs are remnant neutron stars associated with recent supernovae. Unlike most pulsars, CCOs generally lack pulsed radio emission or variation in the observed x-rays due to such phenomena being either nonexistent or difficult to detect. The weaker magnetic fields than most other detected neutron stars means that most of the detected x-rays are due to blackbody radiation. Confirmation that the CCO is associated with the past supernova can be done using the kinematics of the objects and matching them to the age and kinematics of the host SNR.

The detection in 1980 of 1E 161348-5055 at the center of SNR RCW 103 using the Einstein Observatory was once touted as the first CCO discovery, but is now classified as a slow-rotating magnetar due to magnetar outburst detection. Since that object's discovery, ten CCOs have been positively identified with a further two as candidates.

== List of CCOs ==
The following list of confirmed CCOs and their associated supernova remnants is curated by Andrea De Luca, astronomer at the National Institute for Astrophysics.

- RX J0822.0-4300 (center of Puppis A) (pulsations detected)
- CXOU J085201.4-461753 (center of RX J0852.0−4622)
- 1E 1207.4-5209 (center of PKS 1209−51/52) (pulsations detected)
- CXOU J160103.1-513353 (center of G330.2+1.0)
- 1WGA J1713.4-3949 (center of G347.3−0.5)
- XMMU J172054.5-372652 (center of G350.1−0.3)
- XMMU J173203.3-344518 (center of G353.6−0.7)
- CXOU J181852.0-150213 (center of G15.9+0.2)
- CXOU J185238.6+004020 (center of Kesteven 79) (pulsations detected)
- CXOU J232327.9+584842 (center of Cassiopeia A)
