= List of lower mass gap objects =

List of compact objects with mass of 2.5–5 solar masses

In astrophysics, the lower mass gap is a mass range between the maximum mass for a typical neutron star and the minimum mass for a typical black hole, often defined as roughly 2.5–5 solar masses (M_{☉}). A compact object in this mass range often cannot be confidently determined to be a neutron star or a black hole due to uncertainties in measurement and in the maximum mass of a neutron star (the Tolman-Oppenheimer-Volkoff limit).

This list considers a "lower mass gap object" to be any compact object whose estimated mass or mass range overlaps with the range of 2.5–5 M_{☉}.

== List ==
Object	Mass (M_{☉})	Classification (if known)	References
PSR J1641+3627F	1.4–3.7	Neutron star	
Primary object in GW190425	1.60−2.52		
Primary object in V1408 Aquilae	2.0–6.2	Likely black hole	
Secondary object in GW190917_114630	2.1+1.1 −0.4		
XMMU J013236.7+303228	2.2+0.8 −0.6	Neutron star	
PSR J0952−0607	2.35±0.17	Neutron star	
Cygnus X-3	2.4+2.1 −1.1	Likely black hole	
PSR J2017−1614	2.4±0.6	Neutron star	
PSR J1600−3053	2.5+0.9 −0.7	Neutron star	
Secondary object in GW190814	2.59+0.08 −0.09	Likely black hole	
GRO J0422+32	2.7+0.7 −0.5	Black hole	
4U 1543-475	2.7–7.5	Likely black hole	
Secondary object in GW200210	2.83+0.47 −0.42		
2MASS J05215658+4359220	3.3+2.8 −0.7	Likely black hole	
Primary object in Gaia DR3 3425577610762832384	3.6+0.8 −0.5	Likely black hole	
Primary object in GW230529	3.66+0.82 −1.21	Likely black hole	
GRO J1655−40	4.1−7.9	Likely black hole	
GW230529 remnant	4.92+0.62 −0.63		
Secondary object in GW190924_021846	5.0+1.4 −1.9		
Primary object in GW200115_042309	5.7+1.8 −2.1	Black hole	
Primary object in GW190426_152155	5.7+3.9 −2.3		
Secondary object in GW230627	5.79+0.95 −0.92	Black hole	
Secondary object in GW191113	5.9+4.4 −1.3	Black hole	
Secondary object in GW190725_174728	6.3+2.1 −2.5	Likely black hole	
Secondary object in GW191129	6.7+1.5 −1.7	Black hole	
Secondary object in GW231223_075055	6.80+2.00 −2.13	Black hole	
Secondary object in GW231118_090602	7.29+2.13 −3.27	Black hole	
Secondary object in GW231020	7.30+2.06 −2.85	Black hole	
Secondary object in GW230729	7.62+2.12 −2.63	Black hole	
Secondary object in GW190930_133541	7.8+1.7 −3.3	Black hole	
Secondary object in GW200316	7.8+2.0 −2.9	Black hole	

== See also ==
- Stellar black hole § Lower mass gap
- List of most massive neutron stars
- List of least massive black holes
- List of gravitational wave observations
