= A Puppis =

The Bayer designations a Puppis and A Puppis are distinct and refer to two different stars in the constellation Puppis:

- a Puppis (HD 64440)
- A Puppis (HD 54893)

== See also ==
- Puppis A, a supernova remnant in the constellation Puppis
