= HESS J1731−347 =

Supernova remnant

HESS J1731-347
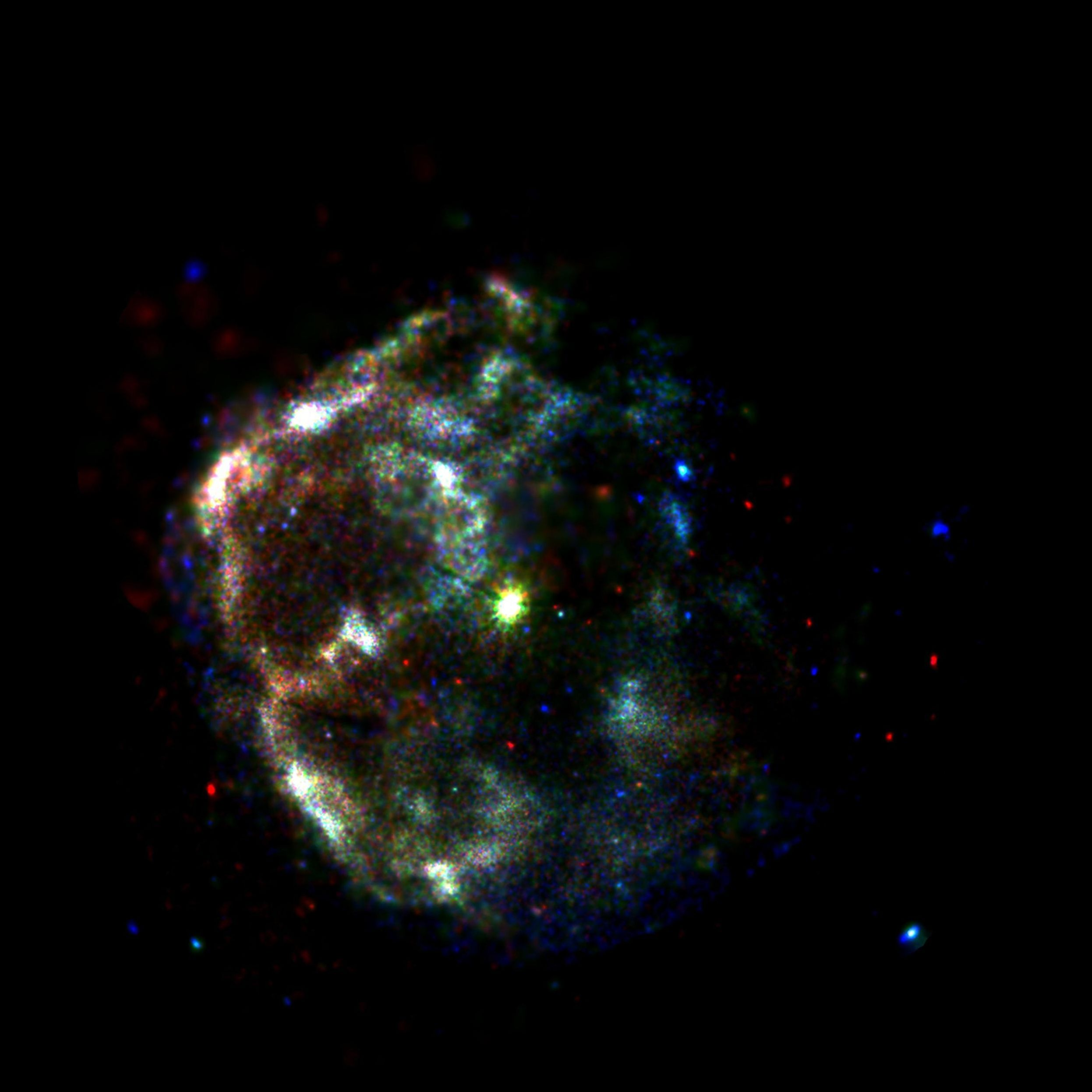
- XMM Newton image of HESS J1731−347
- Event type: Supernova remnant
- II
- Right ascension: 17^{h} 31^{m} 55.00^{s}
- Declination: −34° 42′ 36.0″
- Epoch: J2000
- Galactic coordinates: Milky Way galaxy
- Other designations: HESS J1731−347, SNR G353.6−0.7
- Related media on Commons

HESS J1731−347 (also known as SNR G353.6−0.7) is a young supernova remnant (SNR) located in the southern Milky Way Galactic plane. It was discovered in very-high-energy (VHE) gamma rays by the High Energy Stereoscopic System (H.E.S.S.) telescope array and is notable for its shell-like morphology in TeV gamma rays, making it one of the few SNRs exhibiting such a structure in this energy regime. The remnant is associated with non-thermal X-ray emission indicative of particle acceleration and contains a central compact object. HESS J1731−347 is well studied for cosmic ray production in young SNRs, potentially interacting with adjacent molecular clouds to enhance gamma-ray emission.

The remnant is estimated to be 2–6 thousand years old, with a distance of approximately 3.2–5.2 kiloparsecs (kpc) from Earth, placing it in the Scutum–Centaurus Arm of the Galaxy. Its physical radius is roughly 10–15 km, and it likely originated from a core-collapse supernova of a progenitor star with a mass of 8–25 solar masses.

== Discovery and observation ==
HESS J1731−347 was first detected in 2007 as an unidentified VHE gamma-ray source during the H.E.S.S. Galactic Plane Survey. It was formally identified as a shell-type SNR in 2011, based on observations revealing a faint, asymmetric ring of TeV emission with a best-fit radius of 0.27° ± 0.02°. Other observations are done by Suzaku, XMM-Newton and Fermi Gamma-ray Space Telescope.

== Central compact object ==
At the geometric center lies the CCO XMMU J173203.3−344518 The CCO's parameters strain standard neutron star formation models, which predict minimum masses >1.1 M_{☉} from iron-core collapse. Other proposed explanations include either a low-mass neutron star formation by low-entropy explosions, fallback accretion, or parity doublet models, reconciling with nuclear equation-of-state (EoS) constraints like symmetry energy slope L ≈ 46 MeV and radius around 12.2 km for 1.4 M_{☉} stars or strange quark star allowing stable low-mass configurations while supporting maximum masses ~2.1–2.2 M_{☉} consistent with PSR J0740+6620 and GW170817. Formation via neutron-to-strange conversion in the supernova core could eject ~0.3–0.4 M_{☉}, leaving a subsolar remnant. or a hybrid star with quark core.
