= Radio-quiet neutron star =

Neutron star that does not emit radio waves

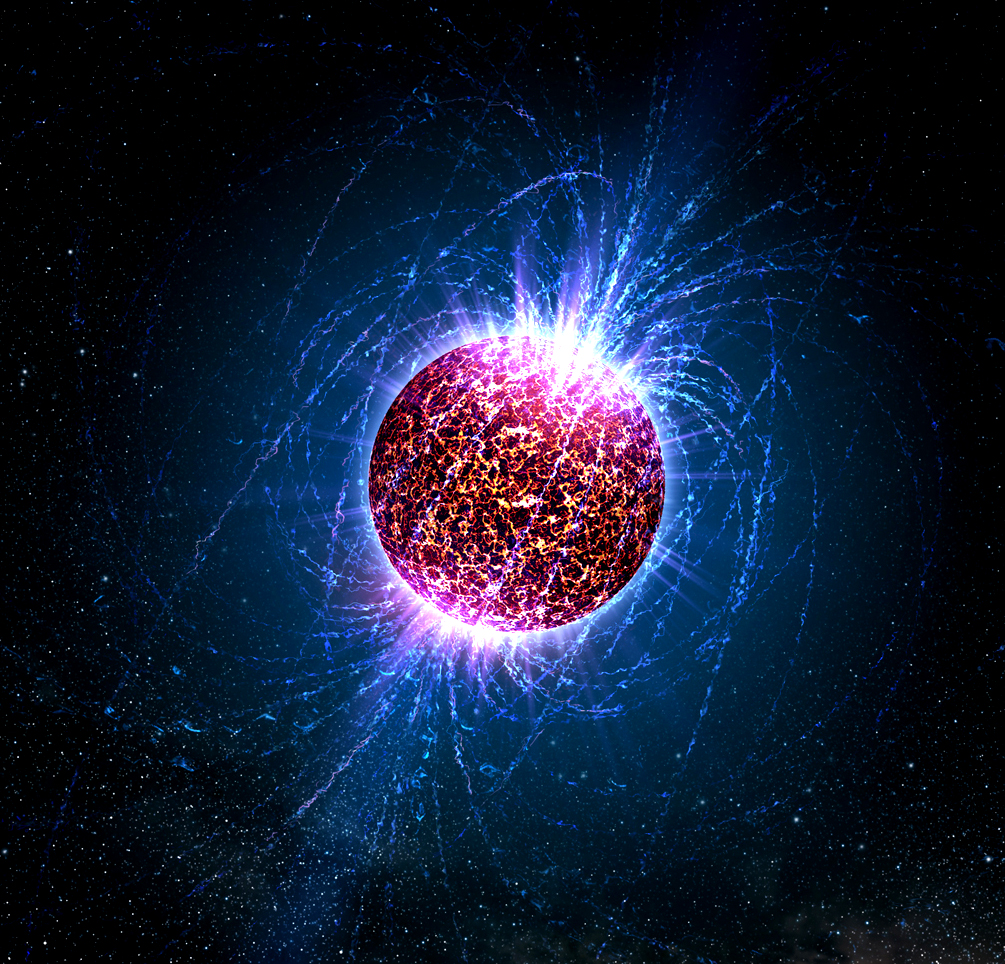
Artist's illustration of an 'isolated neutron star' -- one without associated supernova remnants or binary companions.

A radio-quiet neutron star is a neutron star that does not seem to emit radio emissions, but is still visible to Earth through electromagnetic radiation at other parts of the spectrum, particularly X-rays and gamma rays.

== Background ==
Most detected neutron stars are pulsars, and emit radio-frequency electromagnetic radiation. About 700 radio pulsars are listed in the Princeton catalog, and all but one emit radio waves at the 400 MHz and 1400 MHz frequencies. That exception is Geminga, which is radio quiet at frequencies above 100 MHz, but is a strong emitter of X-rays and gamma rays.

In all, ten bodies have been proposed as rotation-powered neutron stars that are not visible as radio sources, but are visible as X-ray and gamma ray sources. Indicators that they are indeed neutron stars include them having a high X-ray to lower frequencies emission ratio, a constant X-ray emission profile, and coincidence with a gamma ray source.

== Hypotheses ==
Quark stars, hypothetical neutron star-like objects composed of quark matter, have been proposed to be radio-quiet.

More plausibly, however, radio-quiet neutron stars may simply be pulsars which do not pulse in our direction. As pulsars spin, it is hypothesized that they emit radiation from their magnetic poles. When the magnetic poles do not lie on the axis of rotation, and cross the line of sight of the observer, one can detect radio emission emitted near the star's magnetic poles. Due to the star's rotation this radiation appears to pulse, colloquially called the "lighthouse effect". Radio-quiet neutron stars may be neutron stars whose magnetic poles do not point towards the Earth during their rotation.

The group of radio-quiet neutrons stars informally known as the Magnificent Seven are thought to emit mainly thermal radiation.

Possibly some powerful neutron star radio emissions are caused by a positron-electron jet emanating from the star blasting through outer material such as a cloud or accretion material. Note some radio quiet neutron stars listed in this article do not have accretion material.

=== Magnetars ===
Magnetars, the most widely accepted explanation for soft gamma repeaters (SGRs) and anomalous X-ray pulsars (AXPs), are often characterized as being radio-quiet. However, magnetars can produce radio emissions, but the radio spectrums tend to be flat, with only intermittent broad pulses of variable length.

== List of radio-quiet neutron stars ==
=== X-ray Dim Isolated Neutron Stars ===
Can be classified as XDINS (X-ray Dim Isolated Neutron Stars), XTINS (X-ray Thermal Isolated Neutron Stars), XINS (X-ray Isolated Neutron Stars), TEINS (Thermally Emitting Neutron Star), INS (Isolated Neutron Stars). (Note: Isolated Neutron Star can also refer to all neutron stars without binary companions.)

Defined as thermally emitting neutron stars of high magnetic fields, although lower than that of magnetars. Identified in thermal X-rays, and thought to be radio-quiet.

- A group of seven individual, physically similar and relatively nearby neutron stars nicknamed The Magnificent Seven, consisting of:
  - RX J185635-3754
  - RX J0720.4-3125
  - RBS1556
  - RBS1223
  - RX J0806.4-4132
  - RX J0420.0-5022
  - MS 0317.7-6647
- 1RXS J214303.7+065419/RBS 1774

=== Compact Central Objects in Supernova remnants ===
Compact Central Objects in Supernova remnants (CCOs in SNRs) are identified as being radio-quiet compact X-ray sources surrounded by supernova remnants. They have thermal emission spectra, and lower magnetic fields than XDINSs and magnetars.

- RX J0822-4300 (1E 0820–4247) in the Puppis A supernova remnant (SNR G260.4-3.4).
- 1E 1207.4-5209 in the PKS 1209-51/52 supernova remnant (SNR G296.5+10).
- RXJ0007.0+7302 (in SNR G119.5+10.2, CTA1)
- RXJ0201.8+6435 (in SNR G130.7+3.1, 3C58)
- 1E 161348–5055 (in SNR G332.4-0.4, RCW103)
- RXJ2020.2+4026 (in SNR G078.2+2.1, γ–Cyg)

=== Other neutron stars ===
- IGR J11014-6103: a runaway pulsar ejected from a supernova remnant.

== See also ==
- Neutron star merger
- Rotating radio transient
- IRAS 00500+6713 (in 10,000 y)
