= PSR J1930−1852 =

Binary pulsar–neutron star system in the constellation Sagittarius

Observation data Epoch J2000.0 Equinox ICRS
- Constellation: Sagittarius
- Right ascension: 19^{h} 30^{m} 29.716^{s}
- Declination: −18° 51′ 46.27″

Characteristics
- Spectral type: Pulsar + Neutron star

Astrometry
Distance	4,900 ly (1,500 pc)

Orbit
Primary	PSR J1930−1852 A
Name	PSR J1930−1852 B
Period (P)	45.0600007(5) d
Semi-major axis (a)	50900000 km (mean separation) (Note: Orbital separation distance (semi-major axis from primary) calculated with Kepler's Third Law: $a = \sqrt[3]{\frac{GMT^2}{4\pi^2}}$ given total system mass $M$ = 2.59 M_{☉} and orbital period $T$ = 45.0600007 d. Swiggum et al. (2015) determined a minimum projected semi-major axis of 86.890277(7) light seconds (26049049(2) km) from radio pulsation timing.)
Eccentricity (e)	0.39886340(17)
Periastron epoch (T)	JD 2456527.142330(3); 22 August 2013 15:24:57 UTC

Details

PSR J1930−1852 A
Mass	≤1.32 M_{☉}
Rotation	0.18552016047926(8) s
Age	163 Myr

PSR J1930−1852 B
Mass	≥1.30 M_{☉}

Other designations
- PSR J1930−1852

Database references
SIMBAD	data

PSR J1930−1852 is a binary pulsar system, composed of a pulsar and a neutron star and orbiting around their common center of mass. Located 4,900 light-years (1,500 pc) away from Earth in the constellation Sagittarius, it is the most distantly-separated double neutron star system known.

== See also ==
- Hulse–Taylor binary, first pulsar in a binary system discovered
- PSR J0737−3039, first double pulsar binary system discovered
- PSR J1946+2052, double neutron star system with the shortest known orbital period
