= G350.1-0.3 =

Supernova remnant

Supernova remnant
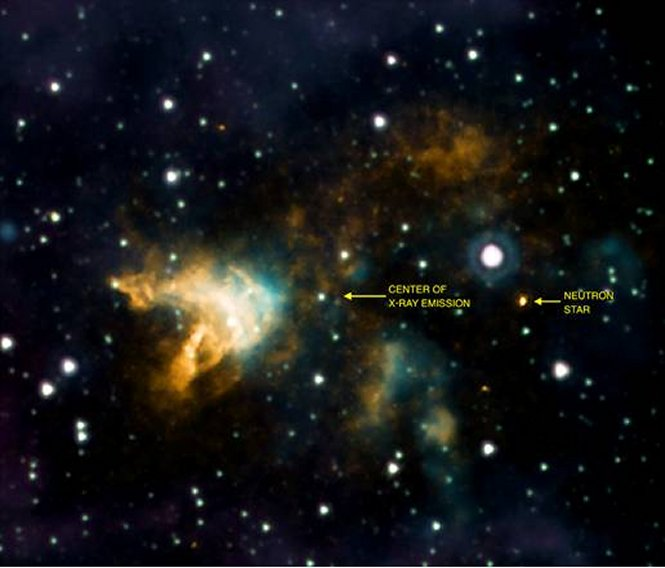
- Supernova remnant G350.1-0.3

Observation data: J2000 epoch
- Right ascension: 17^{h} 21^{m} 01^{s}
- Declination: −37° 26.0′
- Distance: 15000 ly (4600 pc)
- Constellation: Scorpius

Physical characteristics
- Radius: 8 ly (2 pc)

G350.1-0.3 is a supernova remnant which is located in the constellation Scorpius. It is in the Milky Way, and possibly associated with a neutron star (XMMU J172054.5-372652) formed in the same supernova explosion. The object was formerly mistakenly classified as a distant galaxy.

G350.1-0.3, a bright radio source in the inner Milky Way, was initially identified by comparing observations from the Molonglo Observatory Synthesis Telescope and Parkes Observatory and classified as a supernova remnant in publications from 1973 and 1975. However, later higher-resolution images in the mid-80s revealed an unexpected irregular morphology that differed substantially from other supernova remnant sources. It was then argued that G350.1-0.3 was a radio galaxy or a galaxy cluster, resulting in a reclassification in which supernova remnant catalogues downgraded the object to "supernova remnant candidate" or dropped it completely; G350.1-0.3 was subsequently "forgotten".

Research published in 2008 combined archival data and new images from XMM-Newton, the European Space Agency's orbiting x-ray telescope, to demonstrate that G350.1-0.3 is a supernova remnant. The researchers determined that the object's odd shape resulted from exploding next to a dense gas cloud, approximately 15,000 light years from Earth, that prevented even expansion and produced its elongated shape. The researchers also determined that the nearby thermal X-ray source, XMMU J172054.5-372652, is a central compact object of the supernova.

G350.1-0.3 is eight light years across and about 900–1000 years old, making one of the youngest and brightest supernova remnants in the Milky Way. It is unlikely that humans would have seen the supernova explosion because intervening interstellar dust would have likely prevented its viewing from Earth.
