= 5 Serpentis =

Star in the constellation Serpens

- Location of 5 Serpentis (circled)

Observation data Epoch J2000 Equinox ICRS
- Constellation: Serpens
- A
- Right ascension: 15^{h} 19^{m} 18.79744^{s}
- Declination: +01° 45′ 55.4664″
- Apparent magnitude (V): 5.10
- B
- Right ascension: 15^{h} 19^{m} 19.24262^{s}
- Declination: +01° 46′ 04.8433″
- Apparent magnitude (V): 10.09

Characteristics

A
- Evolutionary stage: subgiant
- Spectral type: F8 IV
- B−V color index: 0.50

B
- Evolutionary stage: main sequence
- Spectral type: dK6.2

Astrometry

A
Radial velocity (R_{v})	+54.37±0.13 km/s
Proper motion (μ)	RA: +372.216 mas/yr Dec.: −513.483 mas/yr
Parallax (π)	39.7954±0.0807 mas
Distance	82.0 ± 0.2 ly (25.13 ± 0.05 pc)
Absolute magnitude (M_{V})	+3.02

B
Radial velocity (R_{v})	+55.29±0.26 km/s
Proper motion (μ)	RA: +371.601 mas/yr Dec.: −507.580 mas/yr
Parallax (π)	39.7714±0.0187 mas
Distance	82.01 ± 0.04 ly (25.14 ± 0.01 pc)
Absolute magnitude (M_{V})	+8.10

Details

A
Mass	1.2 M_{☉}
Radius	2.3 R_{☉}
Luminosity	5.0 L_{☉}
Surface gravity (log g)	4.07 cgs
Temperature	6,134±39 K
Metallicity [Fe/H]	+0.02 dex
Rotation	14 days
Rotational velocity (v sin i)	4.8 km/s
Age	4.5 Gyr

B
Mass	0.638 M_{☉}
Radius	0.563 R_{☉}
Luminosity	0.111 L_{☉}
Surface gravity (log g)	4.55 cgs
Temperature	4,241 K

Other designations
- 5 Ser, BD+02°2944, HR 5694, WDS J15193+0146AB
- A: MQ Ser, HD 136202, HIP 74975, SAO 120946
- B: TIC 461308071

Database references
SIMBAD	data
- B

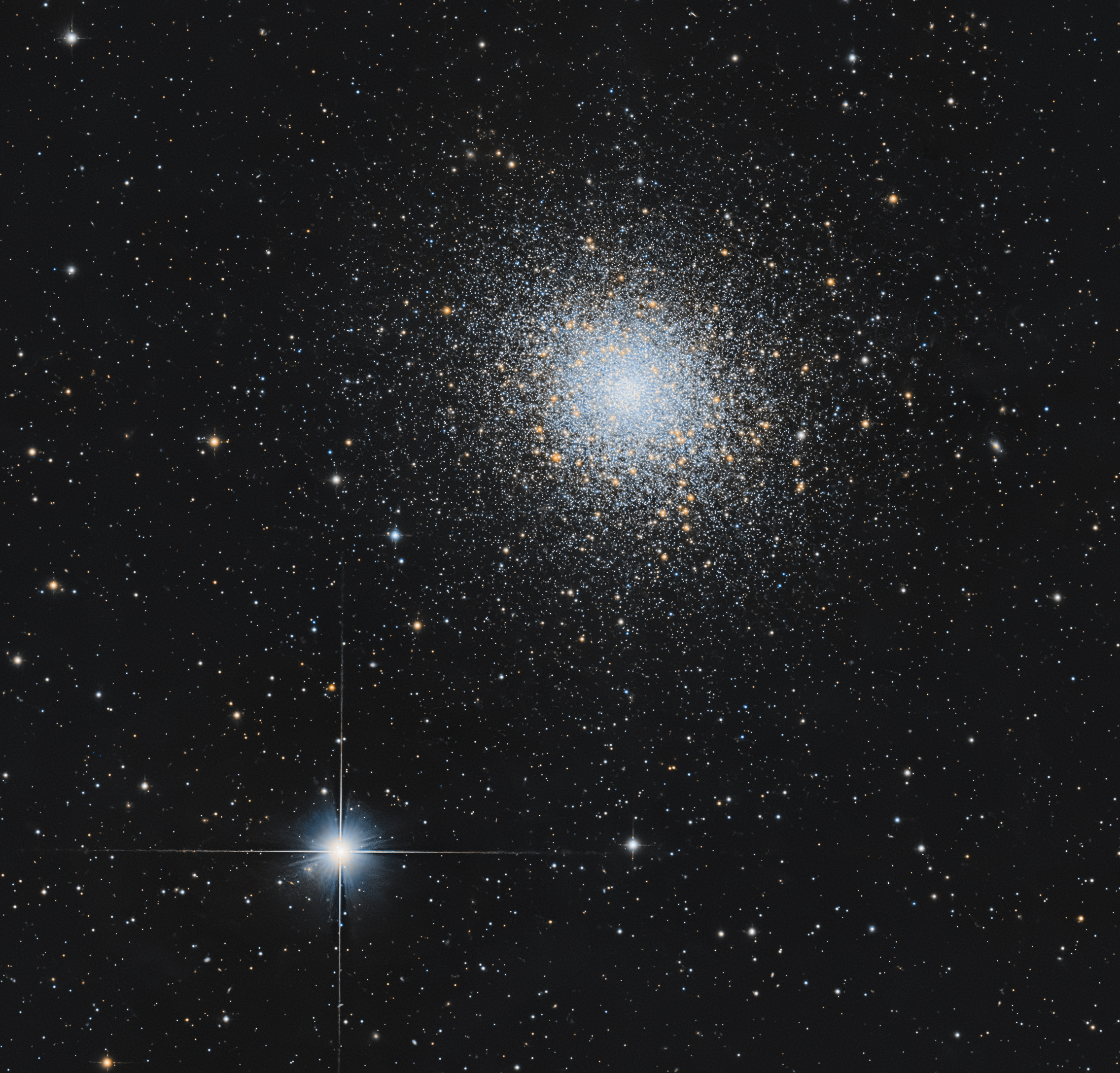
5 Serpentis, near the globular cluster Messier 5

5 Serpentis is a wide binary star system in Serpens Caput, the western section of the equatorial constellation of Serpens. It is faintly visible to the naked eye with an apparent visual magnitude of 5.10. Based upon an annual parallax shift of 39.8 mas as viewed from Earth's orbit, it is located 82 light years away. The brighter member is an IAU radial velocity standard star, and it is moving away from the Sun with a heliocentric radial velocity of +54.3 km/s. The system made its closest approach to the Sun about 153,000 years ago at a separation of 68 ly (20.7 pc).

The primary, component A, is an F-type subgiant star with a stellar classification of F8 IV, a star that has exhausted its core hydrogen and is evolving to become a red giant. The star was once thought to be a BY Draconis variable with the variable star designation MQ Ser, but has been found not to be. From observations made between 1975 and 1980, Bakos (1983) reported random, small brightness variations with an amplitude of less than 0.03 magnitude, plus three flare events that increased the brightness by 0.1 magnitudes. However, Scarfe (1985) noted that these observations may instead be due to normal observational error.

The common proper motion companion, component B, is a magnitude 10.1 star at an angular separation of 11.4″ along a position angle of 35°. It has an estimated orbital period of 3,371 years. According to Hoffleit (1991), if this is a variable star it may account for the observations of Bakos (1983).
