= PSR J2124−3358 =

Millisecond pulsar in the constellation Microscopium

Observation data Epoch J2000.0 Equinox ICRS
- Constellation: Microscopium
- Right ascension: 21^{h} 24^{m} 43.8464^{s}
- Declination: −33° 58′ 44.961″

Characteristics
- Spectral type: Pulsar

Astrometry
Proper motion (μ)	RA: −14.09 mas/yr Dec.: −50.23 mas/yr
Distance	881 ly (270 pc)

Details
Rotation	4.93111494511372 ms
Age	7.2 Gyr

Other designations
- PSR J2124−3358

Database references
SIMBAD	data

PSR J2124−3358 is a millisecond pulsar located in the constellation Microscopium. It is one of the brightest examples of its type in the X-ray spectrum. Discovered in 1997, no optical component was observed in 2003. It rotates every 4.9311 milliseconds and is characteristic age of 7.2 billion years old.
