= HD 54893 =

Star in the constellation Puppis

- Location of HD 54893 (circled)

Observation data Epoch J2000.0 Equinox ICRS
- Constellation: Puppis
- Right ascension: 07^{h} 08^{m} 51.06814^{s}
- Declination: −39° 39′ 20.3590″
- Apparent magnitude (V): 4.83

Characteristics
- Evolutionary stage: main sequence
- Spectral type: B2IV-V
- U−B color index: −0.69
- B−V color index: −0.18
- Variable type: suspected β Cep

Astrometry
Radial velocity (R_{v})	+19.50 km/s
Proper motion (μ)	RA: −10.577 mas/yr Dec.: +7.785 mas/yr
Parallax (π)	3.7743±0.0894 mas
Distance	860 ± 20 ly (265 ± 6 pc)
Absolute magnitude (M_{V})	−2.05

Details
Mass	6.3 M_{☉}
Radius	7.0 R_{☉}
Luminosity	2,389 L_{☉}
Surface gravity (log g)	3.56 cgs
Temperature	15,974 K
Metallicity [Fe/H]	+0.20 dex
Rotational velocity (v sin i)	42.8 km/s
Age	21.6 Myr

Other designations
- A Puppis, 67 G. Puppis, NSV 3431, CD−39°3105, FK5 2551, GC 9463, HD 54893, HIP 34495, HR 2702, SAO 197632

Database references
SIMBAD	data

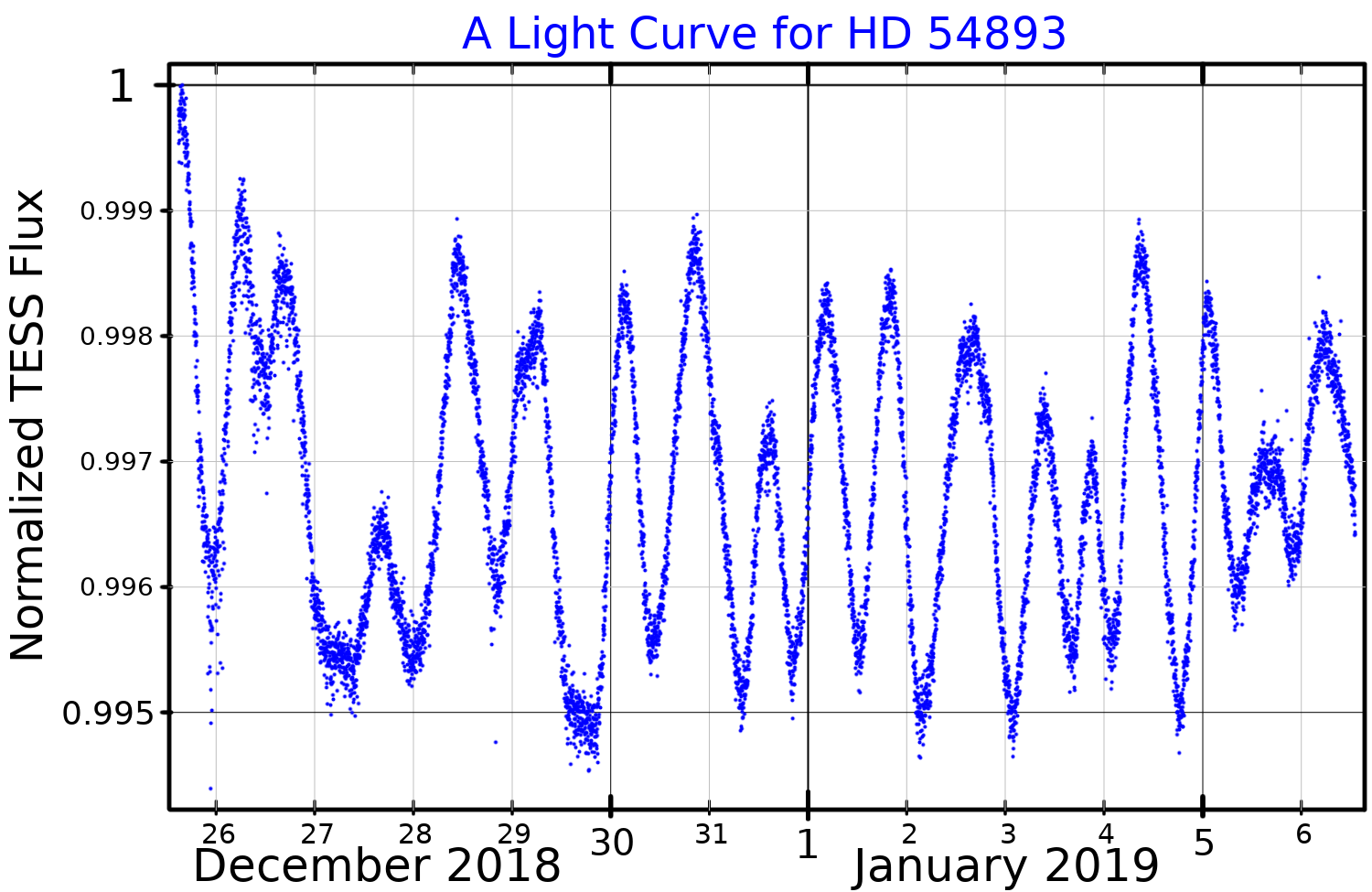
A light curve for HD 54893, plotted from TESS data

HD 54893, often called A Puppis is a suspected variable star in the constellation Puppis. Its apparent magnitude is 4.83 and is approximately 860 light years away based on parallax.

With a mass over six times that of the Sun, HD 54893 is a hot luminous star with an effective temperature of about 16,000 K and a bolometric luminosity of 2,400 L_{☉}. The spectral class of B2IV/V suggest it is on the border between the main sequence and the subgiant branch. Evolutionary models show it is towards the end of the main sequence at an age of about 22 million years.

In a 1971 paper, HD 54893 is mentioned as being a confirmed β Cephei variable, but with no explanation of when it was discovered. A 1971 thesis dedicated to β Cephei variables only mentions HD 54893 as a non-variable early B star. In a 1977 search for β Cephei stars, it is listed as possibly being variable. It is catalogued as a suspected variable star, but not confirmed.
