= 1E 1207.4-5209 =

Central compact object in the constellation Centaurus

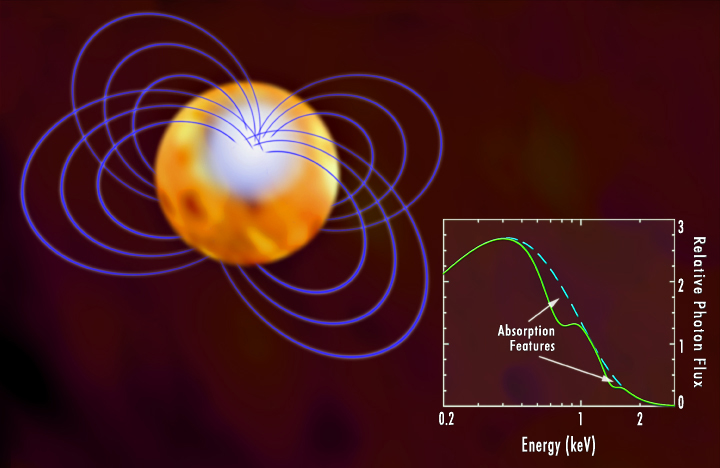
- Artist's impression of 1E 1207.4-5209

Observation data Epoch J2000.0 Equinox ICRS
- Constellation: Centaurus
- Right ascension: 12^{h} 10^{m} 0.88^{s}
- Declination: −52° 26′ 28.4″

Details
Rotation	0.424130748815 s
Age	302 Myr

Other designations
- Blue Eye Pulsar, 1E 1207.4-5209, PSR J1210-5226, 2XMM J121000.8-522628, 1RXS J121000.9-522629, EXO 120723-5209.8

Database references
SIMBAD	data

1E 1207.4-5209 (nicknamed as Blue Eye Pulsar) is a pulsar and a central compact object (CCO) located in the supernova remnant PKS 1209−51/52. It is about 7,000 light-years away, in the southern constellation of Centaurus.

It was first identified as an X-ray source, but was later found to be a pulsar with a rotation period of 0.4241 seconds and an estimated age of 302 million years. In 2026, astronomers picked up radio pulses from the object for the first time, decades after it was first found. This leads to new interest about its unusual properties.
