= PSR J1748−2021B =

Pulsar binary with white dwarf

PSR J174−2021B
- Event type: Neutron star, binary pulsar
- Pulsar
- Date: March 2008
- Duration: 7,514 and 4,285 sec.
- Instrument: Green Bank Telescope
- Constellation: Sagittarius
- Right ascension: 17^{h} 48^{m} 52.9522^{s} (287.2205342°)
- Declination: −20° 21′ 38.90″ (−20.360881°)
- Epoch: 2000
- Galactic coordinates: NGC 6440
- Distance: 223 pc
- Source: SIMBAD
- Remnant: 17
- Host: https://simbad.u-strasbg.fr/simbad/sim-ref?bibcode=2008ApJ...675..670F
- Colour (B-V): BRIGHT 2
- Peak apparent magnitude: 2.548 solar masses
- Other designations: NGC 6440B
- Website: https://simbad.cds.unistra.fr/mobile/object.html?object_name=PSR%20J1748-2021B
- Related media on Commons

PSR J1748−2021B is the most massive-known pulsar, initially calculated with 2.74+0.21
−0.21 M_{☉}. It was first discovered by Freire using the Green Bank Telescope S-band receiver and Pulsar Spigot Spectrometer in Terzan 5 of globular cluster Messier 5.

A later estimate puts the mass as 2.548+0.047
−0.078 M_{☉}.
