= Calvera (neutron star) =

Neutron star in the constellation Ursa Minor

Observation data Epoch J2000.0 Equinox J2000.0 (ICRS)
- Constellation: Ursa Minor
- Right ascension: 14^{h} 12^{m} 55.867^{s}
- Declination: +79° 22′ 03.90″

Characteristics
- Evolutionary stage: Neutron star

Astrometry
| Proper motion (μ) | RA: 78.1 mas/yr Dec.: 8.0 mas/yr |
| Distance | ≤2000 pc |

Details
| Rotation | 59.199071070 ms |
| Age | 285,000 years |

Other designations
- PSR J1412+7922, RX J1412.9+7922, 1RXS J141256.0+792204

Database references
| SIMBAD | data |

Calvera (also known as 1RXS J141256.0+792204) is an X-ray source in the constellation Ursa Minor, identified in 2007 as an isolated neutron star. It is one of the hottest and closest of its kind to Earth.

It is named after the villain in the 1960 film The Magnificent Seven, as it is the eighth such neutron star known within 500 parsecs of Earth, and the seven previously discovered isolated neutron stars are called 'The Magnificent Seven'. The name Calvera was officially added to the IAU Catalog of Star Names on 18 April 2026.

There is a ring of radio emission almost a degree in diameter, offset about 4′.9 from Calvera itself; it is very likely its supernova remnant.
