= List of least massive black holes =

Below there is a list of the least massive known black holes, sorted by increasing mass. The unit of measurement is the solar mass, equivalent to 2.0×10^{30} kg.

== List ==
Name	Mass (M_{☉})	Distance (ly)	Companion class	Mass determination method	Notes	Refs.
2MASS J05215658+4359220	3.3+2.8 −0.7	10,000	K-type (?) giant	Spectroscopic radial velocity measurements of noninteracting companion.	In Milky Way outskirts. Recent Hubble ultraviolet data has suggested the companion to this object is actually a warm subgiant, and ruling out smaller compact companions such as a white dwarf.	
GW190425's remnant	3.4+0.3 −0.1	518,600,000	N/A	Gravitational wave data of neutron star merger from LIGO and Virgo interferometers.	97% chance of prompt collapse into a black hole immediately after merger. Alternative study suggests collapse 2.5 hours later.	
NGC 3201-1	4.36±0.41	15,600	(see Notes)	Spectroscopic radial velocity measurements of noninteracting companion.	In globular cluster NGC 3201. Companion is 0.8M_{☉} main sequence turn-off.	
GRO J1719-24/ GRS 1716−249	≥4.9	8,500	K0-5 V	Near-infrared photometry of companion and Eddington flux.	LMXB system.	
4U 1543-47	5.0+2.5 −2.3	30,000 ± 3,500	A2 (V)?	Spectroscopic radial velocity measurements of companion.	SXT system.	
XTE J1650-500	≥5.1	8,500 ± 2,300	K4V	Orbital resonance modeling from QPOs	Transient binary X-ray source	
GRO J1655-40	5.31±0.07	<5,500	F6IV	Precision X-ray timing observations from RossiXTE.	LMXB system.	
GX 339-4	5.9±3.6	26,000	N/A			

== See also ==
- List of most massive black holes
- Stellar black hole
- List of lower mass gap objects
