= GW230529 =

Gravitational wave

- Event type: Gravitational wave
- Date: Detected 29 May 2023, 18:15:00.7 UTC
- Instrument: LIGO
- Distance: c. 201 Mpc
- Redshift: 0.04+0.02 −0.02
- Progenitor type: Neutron star-black hole binary

GW230529 was a gravitational wave observed by the LIGO Livingston detector on 29 May 2023, produced as the result of the merger of a low-mass black hole and a neutron star. It is the first event published by LIGO-Virgo-KAGRA (LVK) collaboration as part of the O4 observing run (started on 23 May 2023), with a dedicated paper.

Its main scientific interest is the low mass of the black hole, estimated to range between 2.5 and 4.5 solar masses (M_{☉}). This places it within the "mass gap" (generally defined as ranging from 3 to 5 M_{☉}), a mass interval where very few objects are observed within the Milky Way. Indeed, this type of object would be too massive to be a neutron star, but too light to be a black hole formed by a supernova according to most models.

== Characteristics ==
GW230529 is the result of the merger of a 3.6+0.8
−1.2 M_{☉} object (thought to be a light black hole) and a 1.4+0.6
−0.2 M_{☉} object (thought to be a neutron star). It occurred at an estimated distance of 201+102
−96 Mpc. While it is unlikely, the mass range for the primary object does not completely exclude the possibility that it is a heavy neutron star.

== Detection ==
The event occurred on 29 May 2023 at 18:15:00 UTC, while only the LIGO Livingston detector was operational. It was reported in low-latency 14 s later by the PyCBC and GstLAL search pipelines. It was also reported by the MBTA pipeline for the paper. It has a signal-to-noise ratio (SNR) around 11. The fact that only one of the detectors was active at the time of the event usually makes detections more challenging, as the search pipelines usually rely on coincident detections in several detectors in order to validate events. The relatively high SNR of the event, coupled to its low mass (and thus longer duration) made the detection possible.

== See also ==
- Gravitational-wave astronomy
