= PSR J1311−3430 =

Millisecond pulsar in the constellation Centaurus

- PSR J1311−3430 and its small stellar companion

Observation data Epoch J2000 Equinox J2000
- Constellation: Centaurus
- Right ascension: 13^{h} 11^{m} 45.724^{s}
- Declination: −34° 30′ 30.35″

Characteristics
- Spectral type: Pulsar

Details
Mass	2.7 M_{☉}
Rotation	2.560371031672 ms
Age	1.94 Gyr

Other designations
- 2FGL J1311.7−3429

Database references
SIMBAD	data

PSR J1311−3430 is a pulsar with a spin period of 2.5603 milliseconds and is characteristic age of 1.94 billion years old. It is the first millisecond pulsar found via gamma-ray pulsations. The source was originally identified by the Energetic Gamma Ray Experiment Telescope as a bright gamma ray source, but was not recognized as a pulsar until observations with the Fermi Gamma-ray Space Telescope discovered pulsed gamma ray emission. The pulsar has a helium-dominated companion much less massive than itself, and the two are in an orbit with a period of 93.8 minutes. The system is explained by a model where mass from the low mass companion was transferred on to the pulsar, increasing the mass of the pulsar and decreasing its period. These systems are known as Black Widow Pulsars, named after the original such system discovered, PSR B1957+20, and may eventually lead to the companion being completely vaporized. Among systems like these, the orbital period of PSR J1311−3430 is the shortest ever found. Spectroscopic observations of the companion suggest that the mass of the pulsar is 2.7 $M_\odot$ (solar masses). Though there is considerable uncertainty in this estimate, the minimum mass for the pulsar that the authors find adequately fits the data is 2.15 $M_\odot$, which is still more massive than PSR J1614−2230, the previous record holder for most massive known pulsar.

== Discovery and observations ==
The Energetic Gamma Ray Experiment Telescope (EGRET) and the Fermi Gamma-ray Space Telescope (Fermi), the successor to EGRET, both performed surveys of the sky for gamma ray emission. The telescopes observed emission on large scales in the sky, associated with emission from the Milky Way, as well as "point" sources, so named because they are smaller than the angular resolution of the telescopes. Some point sources detected by EGRET and Fermi were at the same locations as previously known objects from observations at other wavelengths, and included astrophysical sources such as pulsars and active galactic nuclei. Other point sources, however, remained a mystery, as they had no known counterpart at other wavelengths. One such unidentified source was 2FGL J1317.7−3429 (so named because it was in a catalog of Fermi sources, with the J1317.7−3429 designating its position in the sky in right ascension and declination).

In an effort to detect a new origin of gamma-ray emission, Roger Romani performed a deep search for counterparts of the brightest unidentified gamma-ray sources. His search uncovered optical and X-ray emission at the same location as 2FGL J1317.7−3429 that changed amplitude with a period of roughly 1.5 hours, and suggested that the origin could be a millisecond pulsar in a black-widow-type system, but also noted that this would need to be confirmed by the discovery of pulsations in the gamma-ray data or at radio wavelengths.

Within a few months, this conjecture was confirmed. A blind search of more than four years of Fermi data, led by Holger Pletsch, revealed that 2FGL J1317.7−3429 was a millisecond pulsar with a 2.5603 millisecond period, the first example of a millisecond pulsar detected via gamma-ray pulsations. With the discovery of the pulsations, it was named PSR J1311−3430, with "PSR" denoting pulsar. Follow-up radio observations were able to also detect intermittent radio pulsations with the Green Bank Telescope that were only visible for <10% of the time the source was observed. The authors suggested that the pulses could be eclipsed or scattered by material in the system.

== Characteristics ==
The detection and timing of the gamma ray pulsations was used to determine the spin period of the pulsar to be 2.5603 milliseconds. The presence of the companion to the pulsar causes very slight variations in the time at which these pulses appear to be emitted, meaning precise timing allows the minimum mass of the companion to be determined using Kepler's third law. The minimum mass found with this method is 8.2×10^{−3} M_{☉}, or roughly 8 times the mass of Jupiter. Optical spectroscopy of this companion reveal that it is composed primarily of helium, with no hydrogen detected. Variations in the optical brightness reveal large temperature variations in the companion. Modeling of the variations indicate strong heating of the companion by the pulsar, and that the companion nearly fills its Roche lobe. An object that overflows its Roche lobe will lose mass to its more massive companion. Such a scenario is used to explain how the companion in this system, once likely a star, lost so much mass to become a planet massed object. The accretion of this material also explains the "spin-up" of the millisecond pulsar, so that it can have such a short rotational period. It is possible that PSR J1311−3430 will eventually completely vaporize its companion, and become a solitary millisecond pulsar.

== Significance ==
The identification of a millisecond pulsar via a blind search of gamma-ray data alone provides hope that other gamma-ray sources with unknown origin can be identified as millisecond pulsars, especially given that radio pulses from PSR J1311−3430 were detected less than 10% of the time observed. Among known black-widow-type binary pulsar systems, PSR J1311−3430 has the shortest orbital period, and a mass constrained to be larger than 2.1 $M_\odot$. This mass determination for the pulsar supports the existing notion that these systems are hosts to pulsars with large masses, and also provides constraints on the equation of state for neutron stars, strongly favoring "stiff" equations of state.
