= PSR J1946+2052 =

Binary pulsar–neutron star system in the constellation Vulpecula

Observation data Epoch J2000.0 Equinox ICRS
- Constellation: Vulpecula
- Right ascension: 19^{h} 46^{m} 14.130^{s}
- Declination: +20° 52′ 24.64″

Characteristics
- Spectral type: Pulsar + neutron star

Astrometry
Distance	11,000–14,000 ly (3,500–4,200 pc)

Orbit
Primary	PSR J1946+2052 A
Name	PSR J1946+2052 B
Period (P)	0.07848804(1) d 1.88371296(24) h
Semi-major axis (a)	728,000 km (mean separation) (Note: Orbital separation distance (semi-major axis from primary) calculated with Kepler's Third Law: $a = \sqrt[3]{\frac{GMT^2}{4\pi^2}}$ given total system mass $M$ = 2.50 M_{☉} and orbital period $T$ = 0.07848804 d. Stovall et al. (2018) determined a minimum projected semi-major axis of 1.154319(5) light-seconds (346,056(1) km) from radio pulsation timing.)
Eccentricity (e)	0.063848(9)
Periastron epoch (T)	JD 2457989.502943(3); 24 August 2017 00:04:14 UTC

Details

PSR J1946+2052 A
Mass	<1.31 M_{☉}
Rotation	16.96017532298 ms
Age	≈ 290 Myr

PSR J1946+2052 B
Mass	>1.18 M_{☉}

Other designations
- PSR J1946+2052

Database references
SIMBAD	data

PSR J1946+2052 is a short-period binary pulsar system located 11,000–14,000 light-years (3,500–4,200 pc) away from Earth in the constellation Vulpecula. The system consists of a pulsar and a neutron star orbiting around their common center of mass every 1.8837 hours, which is the shortest orbital period among all known double neutron star systems as of 2022. The general theory of relativity predicts their orbits are gradually decaying due to emitting gravitational waves, which will eventually lead to a neutron star merger and a kilonova in 46 million years.

The PSR J1946+2052 system was discovered by radio astronomers on 19 July 2017, during a survey for pulsars with the Arecibo Observatory's 305-metre (1,000 ft) radio telescope at Arecibo, Puerto Rico. The primary component of PSR J1946+2052 system, the pulsar, has a rotation period of 16.96 milliseconds and an estimated mass below 1.31 solar masses. The invisible neutron star companion likely has a lower mass of at least 1.18 solar masses, which amounts to a total system mass of approximately 2.50 solar masses, making PSR J1946+2052 potentially the lowest-mass double neutron star system known as of 2022.

== Discovery ==
The PSR J1946+2052 system was discovered by radio astronomers on 19 July 2017, during the PALFA Survey for pulsars in the Milky Way's galactic plane with the Arecibo Observatory's 305-metre (1,000 ft) radio telescope at Arecibo, Puerto Rico. A search in archival imagery shows that PSR J1946+2052 was not detected in infrared to gamma-ray wavelengths.

== Location and distance ==
PSR J1946+2052 is located in the northern celestial hemisphere in the constellation Vulpecula. Its equatorial coordinates based on the J2000 epoch are RA 19^{h} 46^{m} 14.13^{s} and Dec +20° 52′ 24.6″; these are indicated in its pulsar identifier PSR J1946+2052. In galactic coordinates, it lies in the Milky Way's galactic plane with a galactic latitude 1.98° south and a galactic longitude 57.66° east from the Galactic Center. The time delay between different frequencies of PSR J1946+2052's radio pulses indicates a dispersion measure of 93.965±0.003 pc/cm^{3}, which suggests a distance between 11,000–14,000 light-years (3,500–4,200 pc) from Earth, depending on the electron number density in the interstellar medium between the pulsar system and Earth. It is unlikely in the near future that PSR J1946+2052's distance could be determined more precisely with direct methods such as very-long-baseline interferometry or hydrogen line absorption, as it is too faint and distant.

== Origin ==
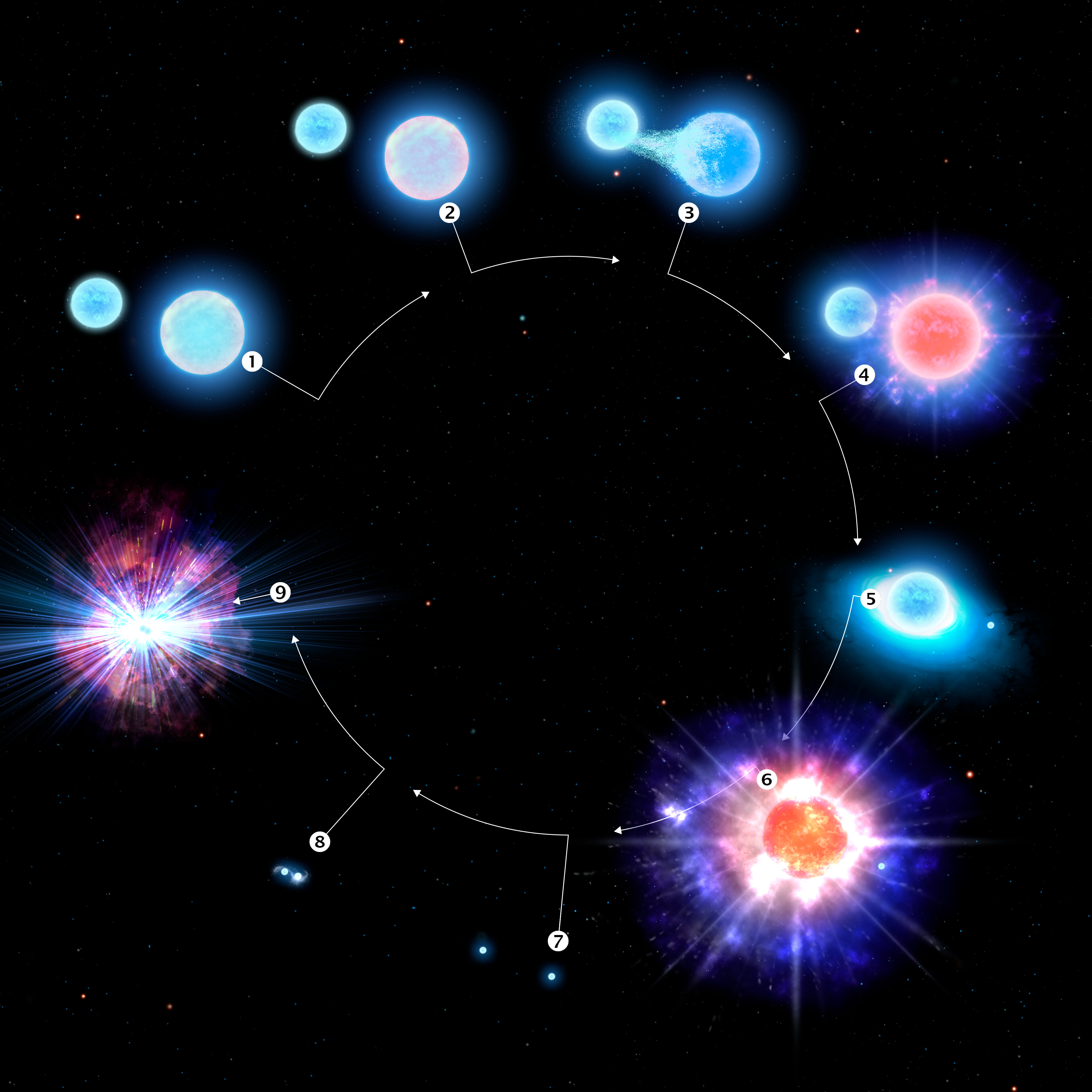
Infographic depicting the evolutionary stages of double neutron star systems

Double neutron star systems such as PSR J1946+2052 are thought to have formed from the asynchronous evolution of two high-mass stars in a wide binary system. The higher-mass star first evolves and explodes in a supernova, leaving a neutron star remnant in an eccentric mutual orbit with the surviving companion star. As the companion star evolves into a supergiant and expands beyond its Roche lobe, it begins transferring mass to the neutron star, which energetically accretes the material and spins up to a rotation period of a few milliseconds, becoming a recycled millisecond pulsar and an X-ray binary. The aging companion star eventually engulfs the pulsar in a gaseous common envelope and their mutual orbit begins to circularize and shrink due to drag forces within the envelope. The pulsar continues accreting and strips the companion star of its hydrogen envelope, turning it into a helium star. The helium star eventually explodes in an ultra-stripped supernova with minimal ejecta, resulting in a low momentum kick that leaves the resulting neutron star pair bound in a low-eccentricity orbit around each other. The second-born neutron star from this supernova is expected to pulsate for only a few million years before its rotation slows down sufficiently for its pulsation mechanism to turn off. On the other hand, the first-born pulsar is expected to continue pulsating for billions of years due to the high angular momentum it had acquired from accretion.

== Physical characteristics ==
The total mass of the PSR J1946+2052 system is 2.50±0.04 M_{☉}, which is determined from the components' mutual orbital period using Kepler's third law. This is potentially the lowest mass measured for a double neutron star system as of 2022, though it could be tied with PSR J1411+2551 (2.538±0.022 M_{☉}) within uncertainty bounds. Although the individual component masses have not been measured directly, the binary mass function constrains them to be <1.31 M_{☉} and >1.18 M_{☉} for the pulsar and companion, respectively. A more detailed analysis of the Einstein delay (gravitational time dilation and Doppler shift effects) in the pulsar's pulsation timing would enable a more precise measurement of both components' masses.

=== Pulsar ===
The pulsar is the only electromagnetically detectable component of the PSR J1946+2052 system. It pulsates in radio wavelengths 59 times per second, corresponding to a rotation period of 16.96 milliseconds. Due to the generation of electromagnetic radiation by its rotating magnetic field, the pulsar is gradually losing rotational kinetic energy at a spin-down luminosity of 7.5×10^{33} ergs per second (7.5×10^{26} W or 2.0 L_{☉}) and its rotation period is increasing at a rate of (9±2)×10^{−19} seconds per second. This is a relatively low spin-down rate for a neutron star, which suggests the pulsar must have a weakened surface magnetic field strength of 4×10^{9} gauss (4.0×10^{5} T). This weakened magnetic field is thought to be the result of the pulsar having accreted matter from a past companion star, which accumulated onto the pulsar's surface and buried its original surface magnetic field. This indicates that the pulsar is the first-born stellar remnant of the PSR J1946+2052 system. The pulsar is estimated to have a characteristic age of 290 million years, assuming it only experienced constant spin-down to its present rotation period. However, this is likely not accurate to pulsar's true age because it underwent rotational spin-up through accretion in the past.

=== Companion ===
The companion was discovered from the periodic Doppler shifting in the pulsar's pulsation frequency, due to the orbital motion of the pulsar induced by the companion. It is inferred to be a neutron star, consistent with its high mass and expected evolutionary history. Having formed last in an ultra-stripped supernova of its progenitor star, the companion should be younger than the pulsar and likely did not undergo rotational spin-up through accretion. The companion does not exhibit radio pulsations, either because its electromagnetic beams do not point towards Earth or its pulsation mechanism has turned off. Since it could not be detected directly, very little is known about the companion's properties.

== Orbit ==
The components orbit about their common center of mass, or barycenter, in a period of 1.8837 hours. This is the shortest orbital period among all known double neutron star systems as of 2022. In 2017, the system was losing 0.13 L_{☉} (5.0×10^{25} W) of energy to gravitational wave emissions and its orbital period was decreasing at an instantaneous rate of 1.78×10^{−12} seconds per second. The orbital decay rate will progressively increase in magnitude as the components spiral closer to each other, and will lead to a neutron star merger in 46 million years. Integrating the components' orbital decay backwards in time shows that their mutual orbit had an eccentricity less than 0.14 and a period less than 0.17 days (4.1 h) before the companion's progenitor star went supernova. The orbiting neutron stars of the PSR J1946+2052 system experience relativistic apsidal precession at a very high rate of 25.6±0.3 degrees per year, making it also the fastest-precessing double neutron star system known.

== Merger ==
Within milliseconds after merging, atomic nuclei inside the neutron stars undergo rapid neutron capture, producing copious neutrinos and numerous elements heavier than iron in the process. For low-mass neutron star mergers like PSR J1946+2052, these heavy elements are predicted to predominantly consist of lighter nuclides with atomic mass numbers less than A < 130, with small amounts of lanthanides and heavier nuclides accounting for 0.2%–0.4% of the remaining nucleosynthesized mass. Up to 0.1 M_{☉} of these heavy elements are predicted to be ejected outward at about 0.1 times the speed of light, due to the extreme angular momentum and heating involved in the merger. These heavy elements would then be intensely irradiated by the merger-produced neutrinos about 0.1 seconds later, becoming accelerated to speeds over 0.3 times the speed of light. Over time, these ejected heavy elements undergo radioactive decay and produce electromagnetic radiation from infrared to ultraviolet wavelengths, generating a kilonova.

The elemental abundances of most known stars do not match that predicted for low-mass star mergers, suggesting that low-mass star mergers must be rare occurrences. The low total mass of the PSR J1946+2052 merger will likely form a strongly magnetized supramassive neutron star remnant that slightly exceeds the 2.1–2.4 M_{☉} Tolman–Oppenheimer–Volkoff limit. This supramassive neutron star would be unstable as the centrifugal forces that prevent its gravitational collapse will diminish due to the loss of angular momentum to gravitational waves and other magnetohydrodynamic processes. The supramassive neutron star would survive for only a few seconds before collapsing into a black hole.

== See also ==
- GW170817 – first neutron star merger discovered
- Hulse–Taylor pulsar – first pulsar in a binary system discovered
- PSR J0737−3039 – first double pulsar binary system discovered
- PSR J1930−1852 – double neutron star system with the longest known orbital period
