= RCW 103 =

Supernova remnant in the constellation Norma

Supernova remnant
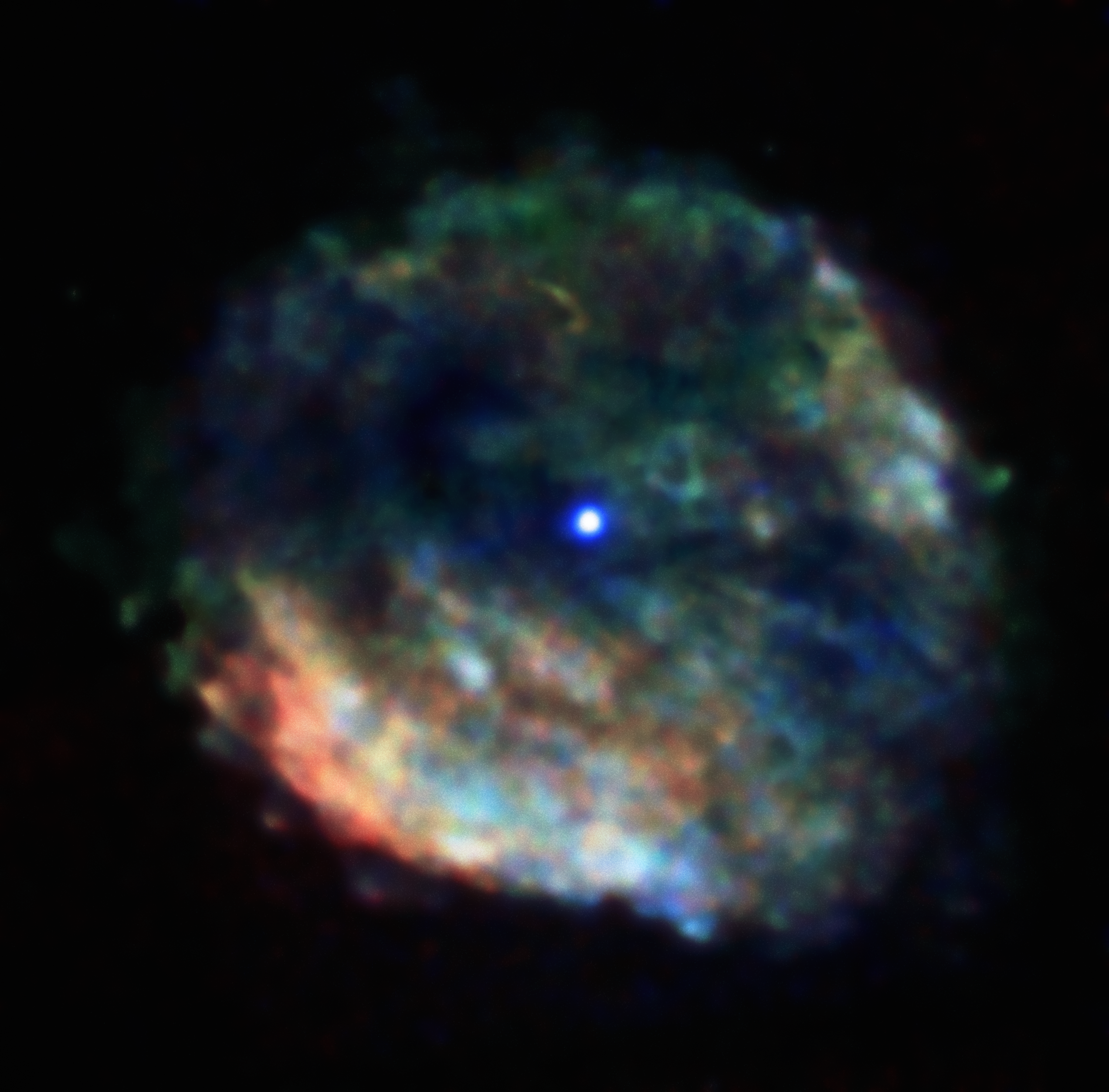

Observation data: J2000 epoch
- Right ascension: 16^{h} 17^{m} 33.000^{s}
- Declination: −51° 02′ 00.00″
- Distance: 3,100–3,300 pc
- Constellation: Norma

RCW 103 is a supernova remnant with right ascension 16^{h}17^{m}30^{s} and declination −51° 02′. It is approximately 2000 years old and contains x-ray source 1E 161348-5055 at its heart. It is 10,000 light years away in the constellation Norma (constellation).
