= The Magnificent Seven (neutron stars) =

Group of isolated cooling neutron stars

The Magnificent Seven is the informal name of a group of young cooling isolated neutron stars at a distance of 120 to 500 parsecs from Earth. These objects are also known under the names XDINS (X-ray Dim Isolated Neutron Stars) or simply XINS.

== History ==
The first to fit this classification was RX J1856.5-3754, which was discovered by Walter et al. in 1992, and confirmed as a neutron star in 1996. The term Magnificent Seven was initially applied to the sources RX J1856.5-3754, RBS1556, RBS1223, RX J0806.4-4132, RX J0720.4-3125, RX J0420.0-5022 and MS 0317.7-6647. However, it was soon shown that MS 0317.7-6647 is, in fact, not a neutron star. Then in 2001 a new object fitting this classification was discovered: Calvera. Since 2001, no new good candidates have appeared. All seven sources were discovered by the ROSAT satellite.

== Characteristics ==
All seven are recognized to be relatively close by (less than a few hundred parsecs), middle-age (several hundred thousand years) isolated neutron stars emitting soft X-rays due to cooling. The cooling is confirmed by the black body shapes of their spectra. Typical temperatures are about 50–100 electronvolts (57.5–115 kilokelvins (see Electron temperature); for comparison, the Sun's corona has a temperature of about 5 megakelvins). At least six out of the seven show spin periods in the range of approximately 3 to 12 seconds.

The light curve shapes are quasisinusoidal and single-peaked. However, RX J1308.6+2127 displays a double-peaked light curve, and in RX J0420.0-5022 there is some evidence for a skewness in the pulse profile, with a slower rise and faster decline. Rather counter-intuitively, the spectrum of both RX J0720.4-3125 and RX J1308.6+2127 becomes harder at pulse minimum.

A coherent timing solution has been recently obtained for RX J0720.4-3125 and RX J1308.6+2127. The periods are changing by 7 × 10^{−14} seconds per second and 10^{−13} s/s, respectively. The derived dipolar field is 2–3 × 10^{13} Gauss and the spin-down ages are 2 and 1.5 million years.

For a long time the Seven were considered to be steady sources, to the point that RX J0720.4-3125 was included among the calibration sources for the EPIC and RGS instruments on board the orbital X-ray telescope XMM-Newton. The continuous monitoring revealed however that the source underwent conspicuous changes in the period 2001–2003. In particular, while the total flux stayed more or less constant, the blackbody temperature steadily increased, going from about 86 to over 90 eV. This was accompanied by a change of the pulse profile, with an increase of the pulsed fraction. More recently this trend seems to have reversed. Starting from 2004, the temperature decreased, and there are hints that the overall evolution may be cyclic, with a period of about 10 years.

The Magnificent Seven represent a large class of young neutron stars with many properties different from normal radio pulsars. There are other types of young isolated neutron stars which are different from standard radio pulsars, such as soft gamma repeaters, anomalous X-ray pulsars, rotating radio transients, and central compact objects in supernova remnants. Some of them can be related to the Magnificent Seven.

Some of the seven have very weak optical counterparts. For the brightest one (RX J1856-3754), the trigonometric parallax and proper motion are known. The distance to the sources is about 161 parsecs. Similar data is obtained for the second brightest object RX J0720.4-3125. The distance is about 330 parsecs. Projected velocities are approximately 280 kilometers per second (km/s) and 115 km/s, respectively. These data allow astronomers to reconstruct the stars' trajectory and so identify the site of their birth. Distance estimates to other sources can be found in Posselt et al. (2007)

Population synthesis studies show that the Magnificent Seven are related to the Gould Belt, a local group of stars with an age of about 30–50 million years formed by massive stars. Reconstruction of trajectories of neutron stars confirmed this conclusion. In the solar vicinity, these neutron stars outnumber radio pulsars of the same age. This means that the Magnificent Seven-like objects may be one of the most typical young neutron stars with a galactic birth rate larger than that of normal radio pulsars.

XMM-Newton's observations made it possible to detect wide absorption features in spectra of several of the Magnificent Seven. Although their origin is not clear yet (see Haberl (2006) for references and more detailed description of the results), it is almost certain that the stars' strong magnetic field plays a fundamental role in their formation. Absorption features may then provide a powerful diagnostics for the strength of the surface field. At present, two main explanations for their origin have been suggested: either proton cyclotron resonances or atomic transitions in light elements. For the two sources in which a spin-down measure is available, the values of B obtained from spin-down assuming magnetodipolar braking are in reasonable agreement with those inferred from the line energy. Once the nature of the lines has been settled and if an independent measurement of the magnetic field is available (e.g. through spin-down), a measure of the gravitational redshift will be possible, paving the way to the simultaneous determination of both the star mass and radius.

=== Physical characteristics ===
Source, RX J	Right Ascension	Declination	Spin Periods, s	Amplitude/2	Temperature, eV	Absorption line energy, eV	Age (million years)
1856.5−3754	18^{h} 56^{m} 35.11^{s}	−37° 54′ 30.5″	7.06	1.5%	60–62	no	3.76
0720.4−3125	07^{h} 20^{m} 24.96^{s}	−31° 25′ 50.2″	8.39	11%	85–87	270	1.90
1605.3+3249 (RBS 1556)	16^{h} 05^{m} 18.52^{s}	+32° 49′ 18.1″	???	–	93–96	450	?
1308.6+2127 (RBS 1223)	13^{h} 08^{m} 48.27^{s}	+21° 27′ 06.8″	10.31	18%	102	300	1.46
2143.0+0654 (RBS 1774)	21^{h} 43^{m} 03.30^{s}	+06° 54′ 17.0″	9.44	4%	102–104	700	3.65
0806.4−4123	08^{h} 06^{m} 23.40^{s}	−41° 22′ 30.9″	11.37	6%	92	460	3.24
0420.0–5022	04^{h} 20^{m} 01.95^{s}	−50° 22′ 48.1″	3.45	13%	45	330	1.98

Data for the table were partly taken from Kaplan (2008), partly from a review by R. Turolla (2009), and partly from other sources. Temperature estimates vary slightly in different publications. The source RX J0720.4-3125 is variable in temperature and pulsed fraction.

== Research ==
The seven objects seem to be the best laboratory to study neutron star atmospheres and, probably, internal structure. The holy grail of neutron star astrophysics is the determination of the equation of state (EOS) of matter at supra-nuclear densities. The most direct way of constraining the EOS is to measure simultaneously the neutron star mass and radius. If a neutron star emits blackbody radiation from its surface of radius $R$ at homogeneous temperature $T$, the received flux at distance $D$ is:

$$F = \sigma T^4 \left(\tfrac{R}{D}\right)^2$$

So, if distance $D$ is known and $T$ can be determined by spectral analysis, the previous relation immediately yields the star radius. Reality is somewhat more complicated, but this oversimplified analysis captures the essence of what is needed in order to measure the neutron star radius: distance, flux and surface temperature. Observing the star thermal emission is therefore crucial. Among all thermally emitting neutrons stars the Magnificent Seven are the only ones with a purely blackbody spectrum. Their clean thermal emission, unmarred by contamination from magnetospheric activity, a surrounding nebula or supernova remnant, makes these sources ideal targets for such a study.

Despite many attempts, no radio emission has been detected from these sources. The preliminary results from latest deep search with the GBT telescope are presented by Kondratiev et al. There are claims that some signal was detected at very low frequencies, but these results are not very certain and require confirmation.

== See also ==
- Calvera (X-ray source)
