= RX J0822−4300 =

Star fragment in the constellation Puppis

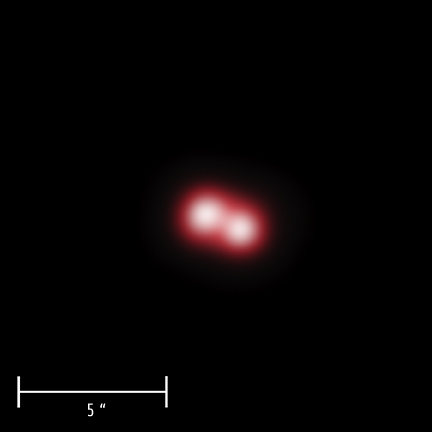
- Motion of the neutron star RX J0822−4300 from the Puppis A supernova event

Observation data Epoch J2000.0 Equinox ICRS
- Constellation: Puppis
- Right ascension: 08^{h} 22^{m} 26.84^{s}
- Declination: −43° 10′ 26.2″

Astrometry
Distance	2,000 pc
Galactic coordinates	260.3841 −03.4718

Other designations
- PSR J0822−4300, 1RXS J082158.2−430022

Database references
SIMBAD	data

RX J0822−4300, often referred to as a "Cosmic Cannonball", is a radio-quiet neutron star currently moving away from the center of the Puppis A supernova remnant at 672±115 km/s, making it one of the fastest-moving stars ever found. Earlier, it was believed to move with speed as high as 1,500 km/s. Astronomers used NASA's Chandra X-ray Observatory to observe the star over a period of 11 years to determine its speed.

Although the cosmic cannonball is not the only hypervelocity star discovered, it is unique in the apparent origin of its speed. Others may have derived theirs from a gravitational slingshot around the Milky Way's suspected supermassive black hole, Sagittarius A*. Current theories fail to explain how such speeds can be attained from a supernova explosion. It could be a possible quark star.

== See also ==
- Puppis A (also known as SNR 260.4−3.4)
