= PSR J0740+6620 =

Millisecond pulsar in the constellation Camelopardalis

- Schematic of a pulsar

Observation data Epoch J2000 Equinox ICRS
- Constellation: Camelopardalis
- Right ascension: 07^{h} 40^{m} 45.799^{s}
- Declination: +66° 20′ 33.60″

Characteristics
- Evolutionary stage: Pulsar

Details
Mass	2.08 M_{☉}
Radius	13–15.1 km
Rotation	2.885736411412693 ms
Age	3.75 Gyr

Other designations
- 3FGL J0740.8+6621, 4FGL J0741.0+6618

Database references
SIMBAD	data

PSR J0740+6620 is a neutron star in a binary system with a white dwarf, located 4,600 light-years away in the Milky Way. It was discovered in 2019 by astronomers using the Green Bank Telescope in West Virginia, U.S., and confirmed as a rapidly rotating millisecond pulsar. It completes spin period of 2.8857 milliseconds and is characteristic age of 3.75 billion years old.

It is among the most massive neutron stars ever observed—with 2.08+0.07
−0.07 M_{☉}, placing it near the boundary of the theoretical maximum. Its mass was calculated via the Shapiro delay of its white dwarf companion as it passed edge-on to Earth. It was the record holder for the heaviest neutron stars until July 2022 when the title was taken by PSR J0952–0607 with a reported mass of 2.35+0.17
−0.17 M_{☉}.

PSR J0740+6620 is estimated to measure 12.39+1.30
−0.98 km (7.70+0.81
−0.61 mi).

== See also ==
- PSR B1913+16
- PSR B1957+20 (1.66–2.4 M_{☉})
- Neutron Star Interior Composition Explorer (NICER)
- List of the most massive neutron stars
