= Messier 5 =

Globular cluster in the constellation Serpens

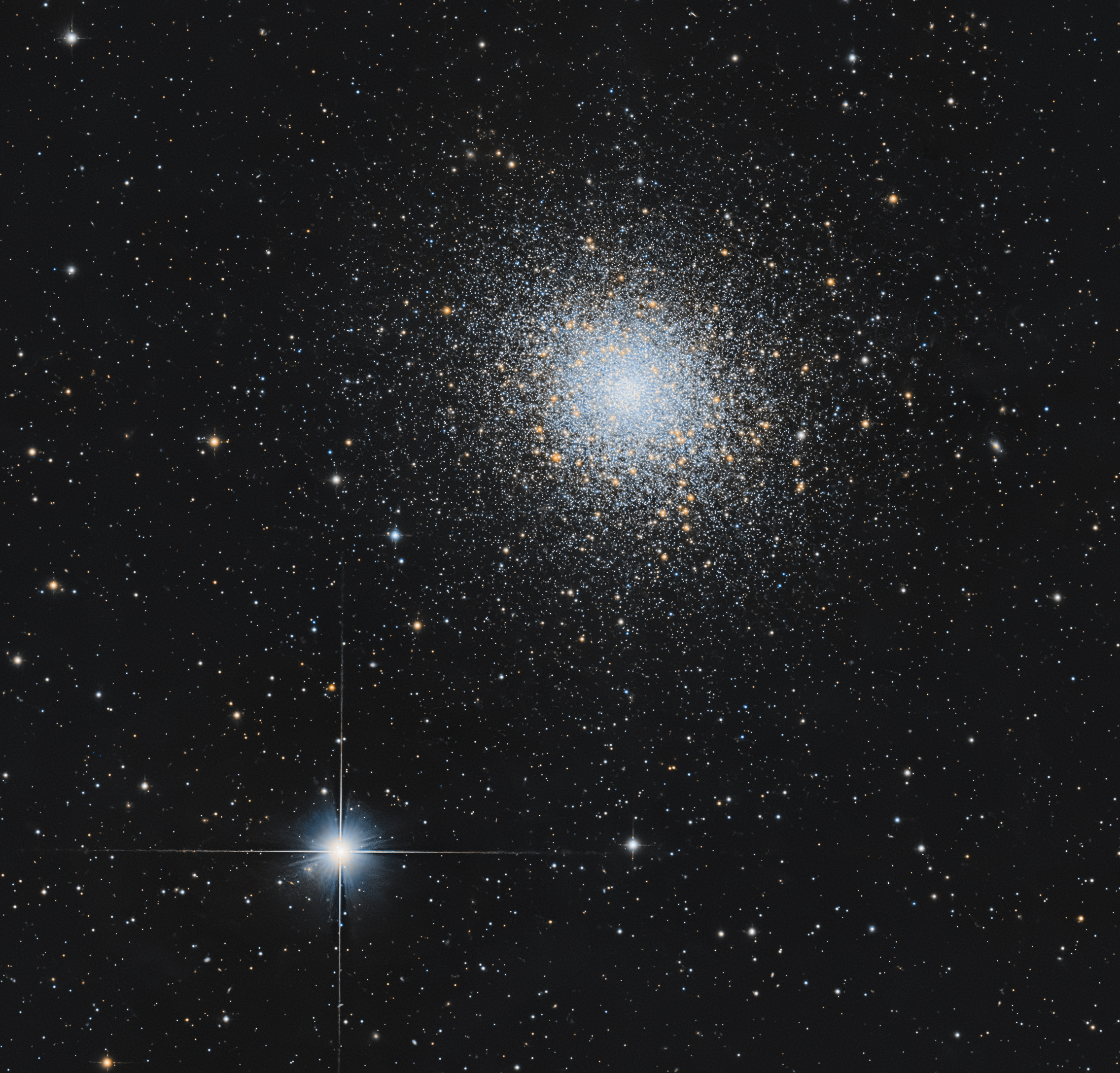
- Globular cluster Messier 5 and the bright star 5 Serpentis below it

Observation data (J2000 epoch)
- Class: V
- Constellation: Serpens
- Right ascension: 15^{h} 18^{m} 33.22^{s}
- Declination: +02° 04′ 51.7″
- Distance: 24.5 kly (7.5 kpc)
- Apparent magnitude (V): 5.6
- Apparent dimensions (V): 23′.0

Physical characteristics
- Mass: 8.57×10^{5} M_{☉}
- Radius: 80 ly
- Metallicity: [Fe/H] = –1.12 dex
- Estimated age: 10.62 Gyr
- Other designations: NGC 5904, GCl 34

Messier 5 or M5 (also designated NGC 5904) is a globular cluster in the constellation Serpens. It was discovered by Gottfried Kirch in 1702.

== Discovery and visibility ==
M5 is, under extremely good conditions, just visible to the naked eye as a faint "star" 0.37 of a degree (22' (arcmin)) north-west of star 5 Serpentis. Binoculars and/or small telescopes resolve the object as non-stellar; larger telescopes will show some individual stars, some of which are as bright as apparent magnitude 10.6. M5 was discovered by German astronomer Gottfried Kirch in 1702 when he was observing a comet. Charles Messier noted it in 1764 and—a studier of comets—cast it as one of his nebulae. William Herschel was the first to resolve individual stars in the cluster in 1791, counting roughly 200. Messier 5 is receding from the Solar System at a speed over 50 km/s.

== Notable features ==
Within M5, there are 105 known variable stars, 97 of them belonging to the RR Lyrae type. RR Lyrae stars, sometimes referred to as "Cluster Variables", are somewhat similar to Cepheid type variables and as such can be used as a tool to measure distances in outer space since the relation between their luminosities and periods are well known. The brightest and most easily observed variable in M5 varies from magnitude 10.6 to 12.1 in a period of just under 26.5 days.

The cluster contains two millisecond pulsars, one of which is in a binary, allowing the proper motion of the cluster to be measured. The binary could help our understanding of neutron degenerate matter; the current median mass, if confirmed, would exclude any "soft" equation of state for such matter. The cluster has been used to test for magnetic dipole moments in neutrinos, which could shed light on some hypothetical particles such as the axion.

A dwarf nova has also been observed in this cluster.

== Gallery ==
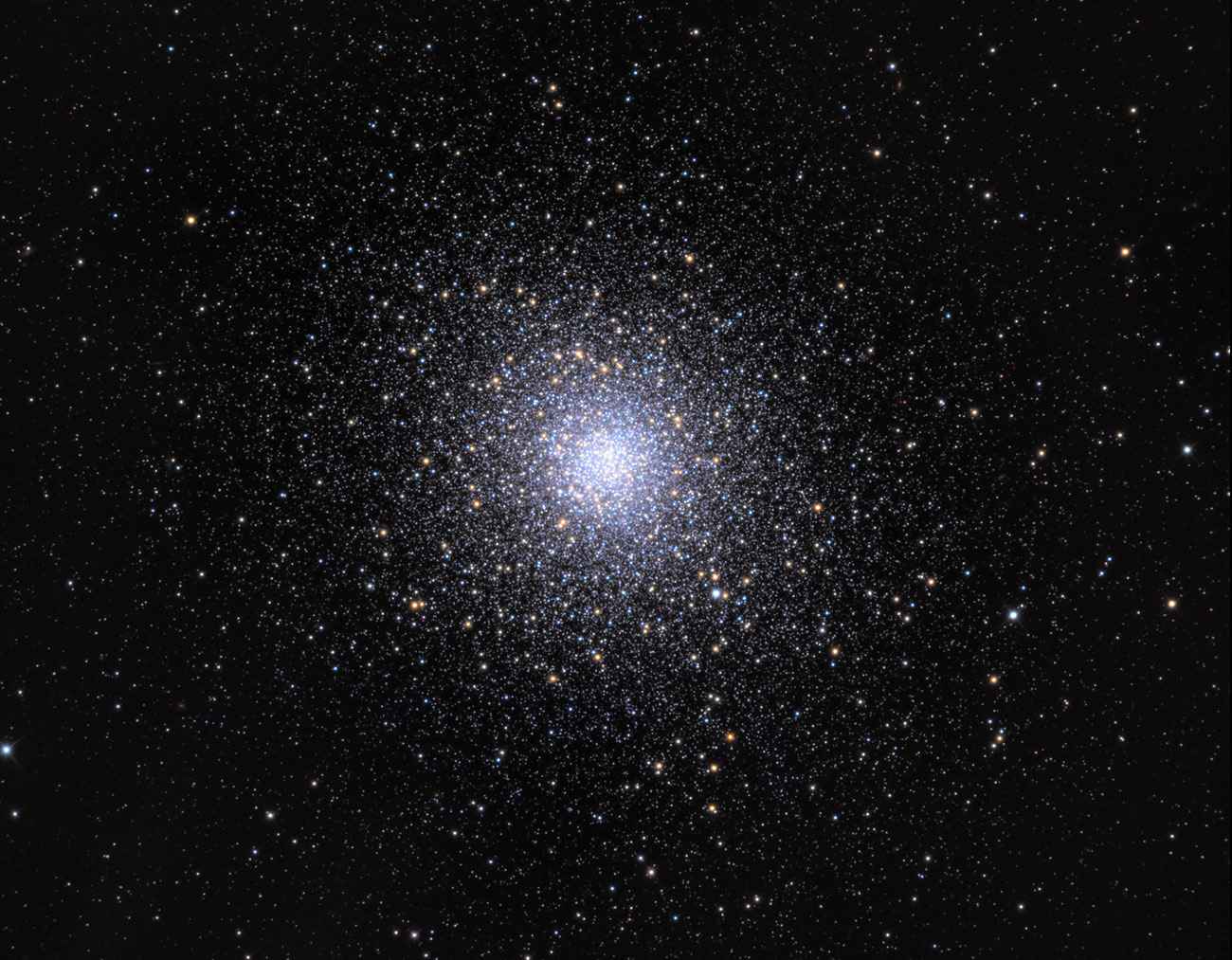
Globular cluster Messier 5 in Serpens

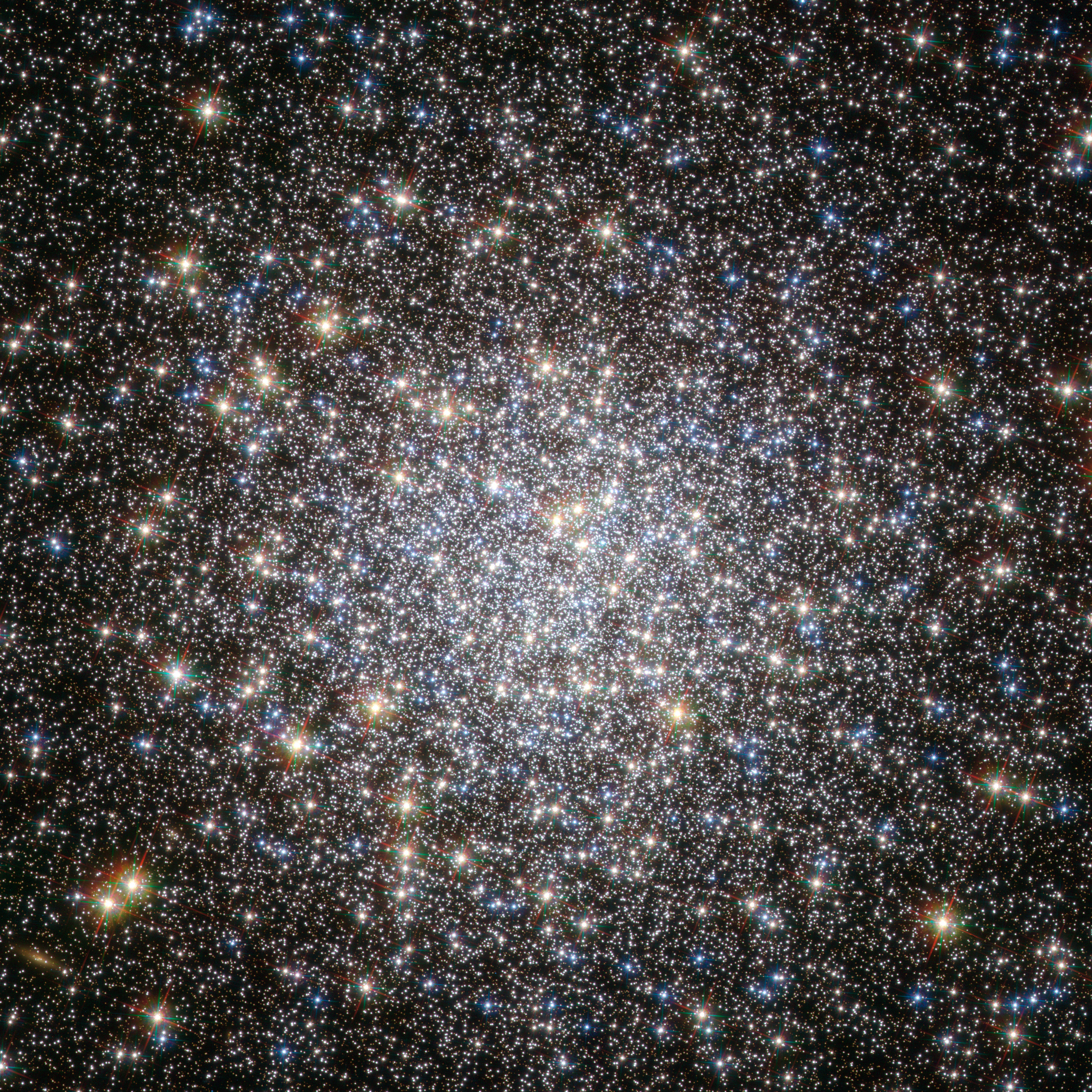
Messier 5 by Hubble Space Telescope – 2.85′ view

== See also ==
- List of Messier objects
