= Puppis A =

Supernova remnant

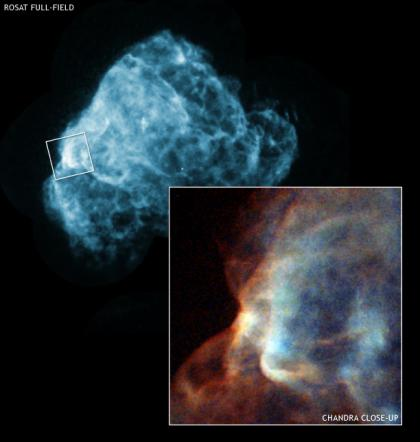
- The Chandra three-color image (inset) is a region of the supernova remnant Puppis A (wide-angle view from ROSAT in blue) which reveals a cloud being torn apart by a shock wave produced in a supernova explosion. ROSAT image is 88 arcmin. across; Chandra image 8 arcmin. across. RA 08^{h} 23^{m} 08.16^{s} Dec -42° 41′ 41.40″ in Puppis. Observation date: September 4, 2005. Color code: Energy (Red 0.4-0.7 keV; Green 0.7-1.2 keV; Blue 1.2-10 keV). Instrument: ACIS. Credit: Chandra: NASA/CXC/GSFC/U. Hwang et al.; ROSAT: NASA/GSFC/S. Snowden et al.
- Event type: Supernova remnant
- S
- Date: 1971
- Constellation: Puppis
- Right ascension: 08^{h} 24^{m} 07^{s}
- Declination: -42° 59' 48
- Epoch: J2000
- Galactic coordinates: l = 260.2°, b = -3.7°
- Distance: 7,000 ly
- Host: Milky Way
- Progenitor: Unknown
- Progenitor type: Unknown
- Colour (B-V): Unknown
- Notable features: central source: RX J0822-4300; Apparent size: 1°
- Other designations: SNR G260.4-03.4, MRC 0821-428, 3FHL J0822.1-4253e, 2U 0821-42, 3A 0821-427, 3U 0821-42, 4U 0821-42, AJG 6, INTREF 352, MSH 08-4-04, PKS 0822-42, PKS 0822-428, PKS J0824-4259, 2FGL J0823.0-4246, 3FGL J0822.6-4250e, 2FHL J0822.6-4250e
- Related media on Commons

Puppis A (Pup A) is a supernova remnant (SNR) about 100 light-years in diameter and roughly 6,500–7,000 light-years distant. Its apparent angular diameter is about 1 degree. The light of the supernova explosion reached Earth approximately 3,700 years ago. Although it overlaps the Vela supernova remnant, it is four times more distant.

A hypervelocity neutron star known as the Cosmic Cannonball has been found in this SNR.

== Puppis X-1 ==
Puppis X-1 (Puppis A) was discovered by a Skylark flight in October 1971, viewed for 1 minute with an accuracy ≥ 2 arcseconds, probably at 1M 0821-426, with Puppis A (RA 08^{h} 23^{m} 08.16^{s} Dec -42° 41′ 41.40″) as the likely visual counterpart.

Puppis A is one of the brightest X-ray sources in the X-ray sky. Its X-ray designation is 2U 0821-42.

== Gallery ==
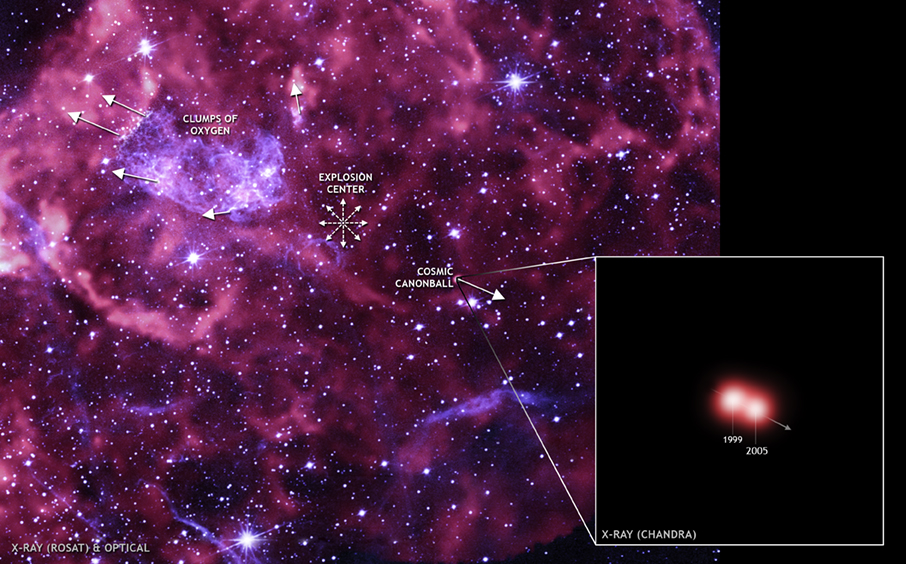
Wide-field composite view of the supernova remnant Puppis A (X-rays from ROSAT in purple, optical data in pink) (28 November 2007)

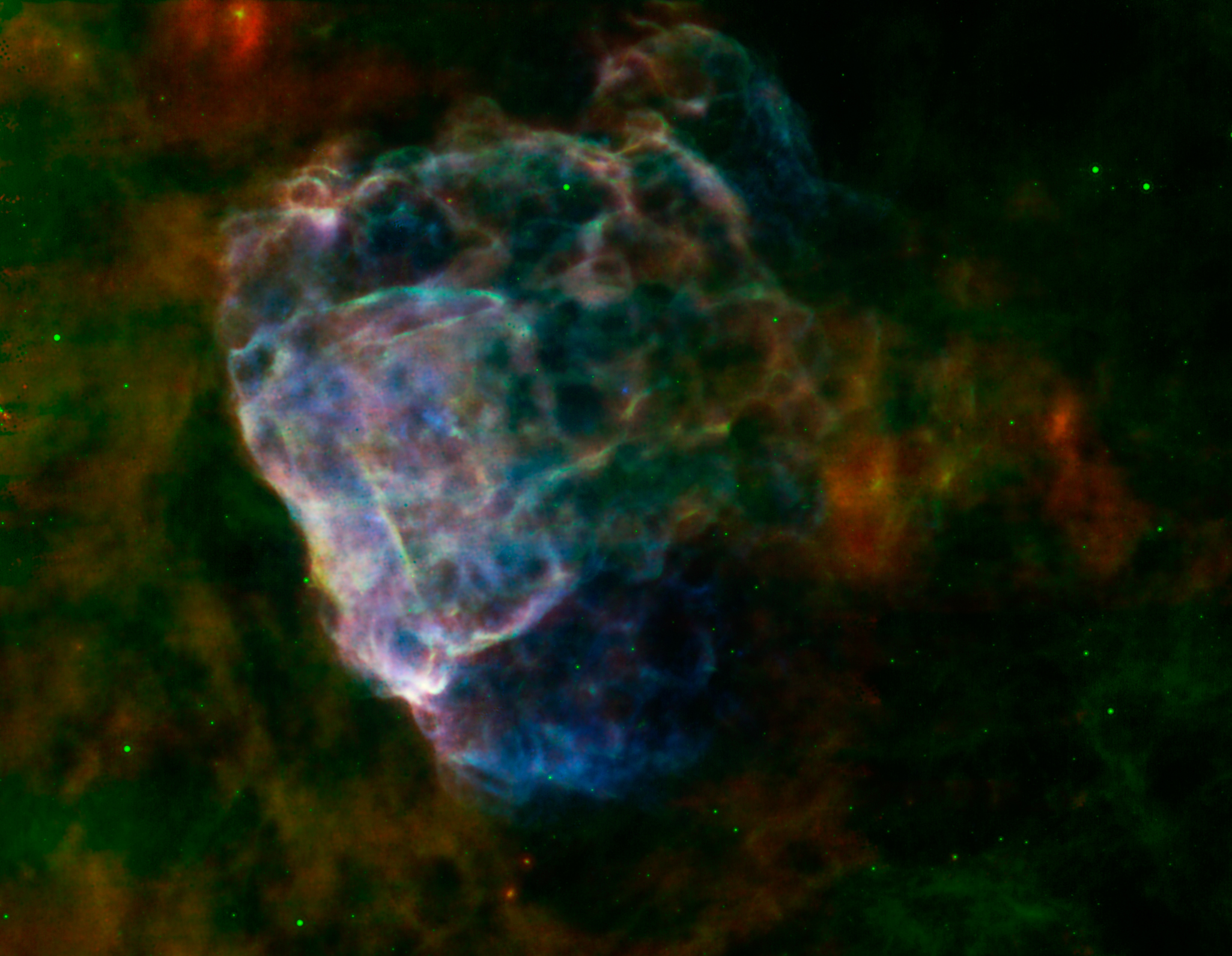
Puppis A: X-ray [blue:0.3-8 keV] + IR [red-green: 24–70 microns] (21 August 2014)

Puppis A: X-ray [blue:high]/[green:medium]/[red:low] (10 September 2014)

== See also ==
- List of supernova remnants
