= PSR J0952−0607 =

Massive millisecond pulsar in the Milky Way

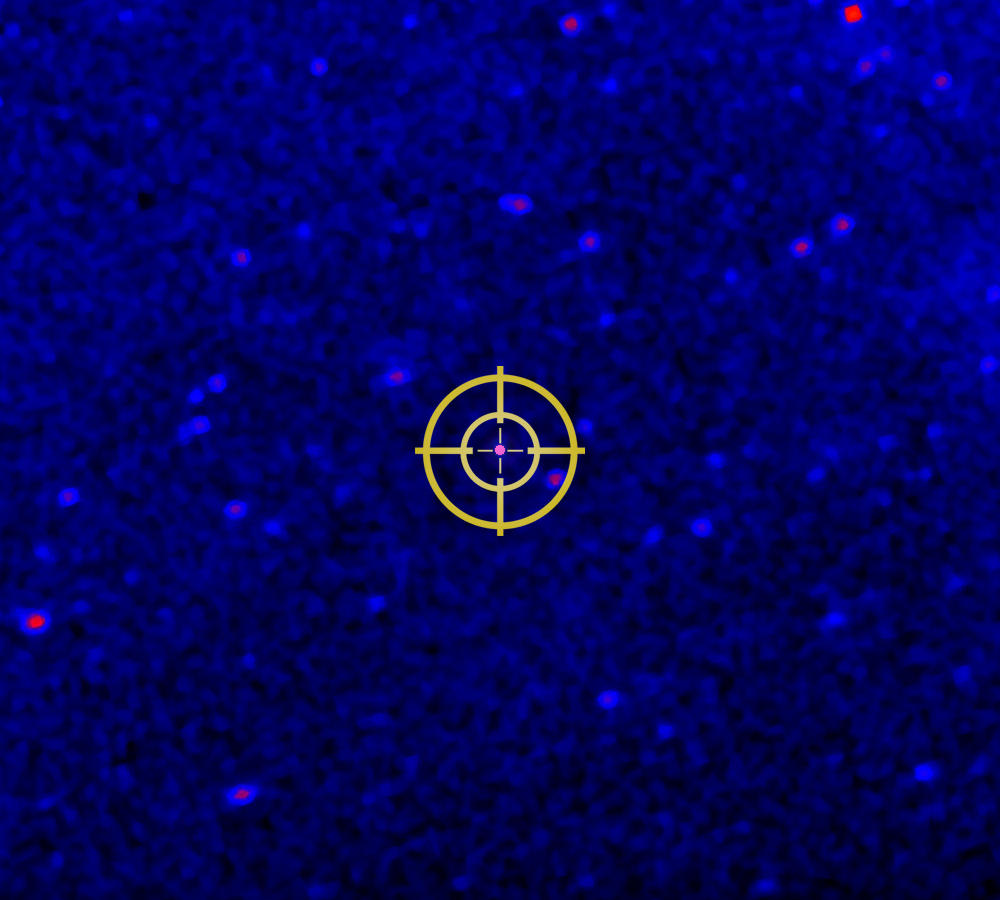
- PSR J0952−0607 (center crosshair) imaged by the Fermi Gamma-ray Space Telescope

Observation data Epoch J2000.0 Equinox ICRS
- Constellation: Sextans
- Right ascension: 09^{h} 52^{m} 08.319^{s}
- Declination: −06° 07′ 23.49″

Characteristics
- Spectral type: Pulsar
- Apparent magnitude (i): 22.0–24.4

Astrometry
| Distance | 970+1,160 −530 pc or 1,740+1,570 −820 pc or 6,260+360 −400 (optical) pc |

Orbit
| Primary | PSR J0952−0607 A |
| Secondary | PSR J0952−0607 B |
| Period (P) | 0.267461035 d (6.41906484 h) |
| Semi-major axis (a) | 1.6 million km (Note: Orbital semi-major axis calculated with Kepler's Third Law: $a = \sqrt[3]{\frac{GMT^2}{4\pi^2}}$ given primary mass $M$ = 2.35 M_{☉} and orbital period $T$ = 6.42 h. Nieder et al. (2019) determined a minimum projected semi-major axis of 0.0626670 light seconds (18787 km) from gamma-ray and radio pulsation timing.) |
| Eccentricity (e) | <0.004 |
| Inclination (i) | 59.8+2.0 −1.9° |
| Semi-amplitude (K_{2}) (secondary) | 376.1±5.1 km/s |

Details

PSR J0952−0607 A
| Mass | 2.35±0.17 M_{☉} |
| Radius | 12.245+0.685 −0.315 km |
| Rotation | 1.41379835502312 ms |
| Age | 4.9 Gyr |

PSR J0952−0607 B
| Mass | 0.032±0.002 M_{☉} |
| Luminosity | 9.96+1.20 −1.12 (Note: Luminosity converted from erg/s to L_{☉}, given 3.81+0.46 −0.43×10^{34} erg/s from Romani et al. (2022) and the solar luminosity L_{☉} = 3.826×10^{33} erg/s.) L_{☉} |
| Temperature | 3085+85 −80 K |
| Metallicity [Fe/H] | –0.5 dex |

Other designations
- PSR J0952−0607, 4FGL J0952.1−0607

Database references
| SIMBAD | data |

PSR J0952−0607 is a massive millisecond pulsar in a binary system, located between 3,200–5,700 light-years (970–1,740 pc) from Earth in the constellation Sextans. As of 2022, it holds the record for being the most massive neutron star known, with a mass 2.35±0.17 times that of the Sun—potentially close to the Tolman–Oppenheimer–Volkoff mass upper limit for neutron stars. The pulsar rotates at a frequency of 707.31 Hz (a period of 1.4137 ms), making it the second-fastest-spinning pulsar known, and the fastest-spinning pulsar known within the Milky Way.

PSR J0952−0607 was discovered by the Low-Frequency Array (LOFAR) radio telescope during a search for pulsars in 2016. It is classified as a black widow pulsar, a type of pulsar harboring a closely-orbiting substellar-mass companion that is being ablated by the pulsar's intense high-energy stellar winds and gamma-ray emissions. The pulsar's high-energy emissions have been detected in gamma-ray and X-ray wavelengths.

== Discovery ==
PSR J0952−0607 was first identified as an unassociated gamma-ray source detected during the first seven years of the Fermi Gamma-ray Space Telescope's all-sky survey since 2008. Because of its optimal location away from the crowded Galactic Center and its pulsar-like gamma-ray emission peak at 1.4 GeV, it was deemed a prime millisecond pulsar candidate for follow-up. The pulsar was reobserved and confirmed by the LOFAR radio telescope in the Netherlands on 25 December 2016, which revealed a 707-Hz radio pulsation frequency alongside radial acceleration by an unseen binary companion. Further LOFAR observations took place from January to February 2017, alongside radio observations by the Green Bank Telescope in Green Bank, West Virginia in March 2017. Optical observations by the 2.54-meter Isaac Newton Telescope on La Palma detected and confirmed the pulsar's companion at a faint apparent magnitude of 23 in January 2017. The discovery was published in The Astrophysical Journal Letters and was announced in a NASA press release in September 2017.

== Distance and location ==
The distance of PSR J0952−0607 from Earth is highly uncertain.

== Binary system ==
The PSR J0952−0607 binary system is composed of a massive pulsar and a substellar-mass (<0.1 M_{☉}) companion in close orbit around it. Because of this configuration, this system falls under the category of black widow pulsars that "consume" their companion, by analogy with the mating behavior of the eponymous black widow spider. The companion is continuously losing mass through ablation by intense high-energy stellar winds and gamma-ray emissions from the pulsar, which then accretes some of the companion's lost material onto itself.

=== Companion ===
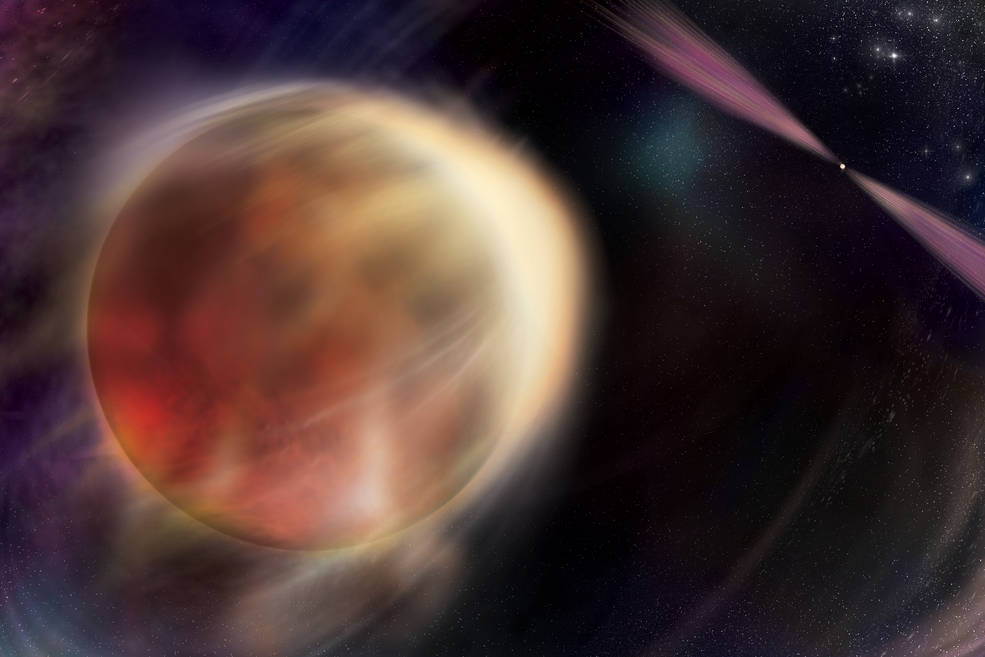
Artist's impression of a black widow pulsar system, where a stellar-mass companion is being ablated by the intense radiation of its host pulsar

The companion orbits the pulsar at a distance of 1.6 million km (1 million mi) with an orbital period of 6.42 hours. Because it orbits so closely, the companion is presumably tidally locked, with one hemisphere always facing the pulsar. The companion does not appear to eclipse the pulsar, indicating that its orbit is oriented nearly face-on with an inclination of 60° with respect to the plane perpendicular to Earth's line of sight. The companion's orbital motion also does not appear to modulate the pulsar's pulsations, signifying a circular orbit with negligible orbital eccentricity.

The companion was likely a former star that had been reduced to the size of a large gas giant planet or brown dwarf, with a present-day mass of 0.032±0.002 M_{☉} or 34±2 M_{J} according to radial velocity measurements. Due to intense irradiation and heating by the host pulsar, the companion's radius is bloated up to 80% of its Roche lobe and brightly glows with a thermal luminosity of about 10 L_{☉}, thereby accounting for much of the system's optical brightness. As a result of bloating, the companion attains a low density likely around 10 g/cm^{3} (with significant uncertainty due to the system's unknown distance from Earth), making it susceptible to tidal deformation by the pulsar.

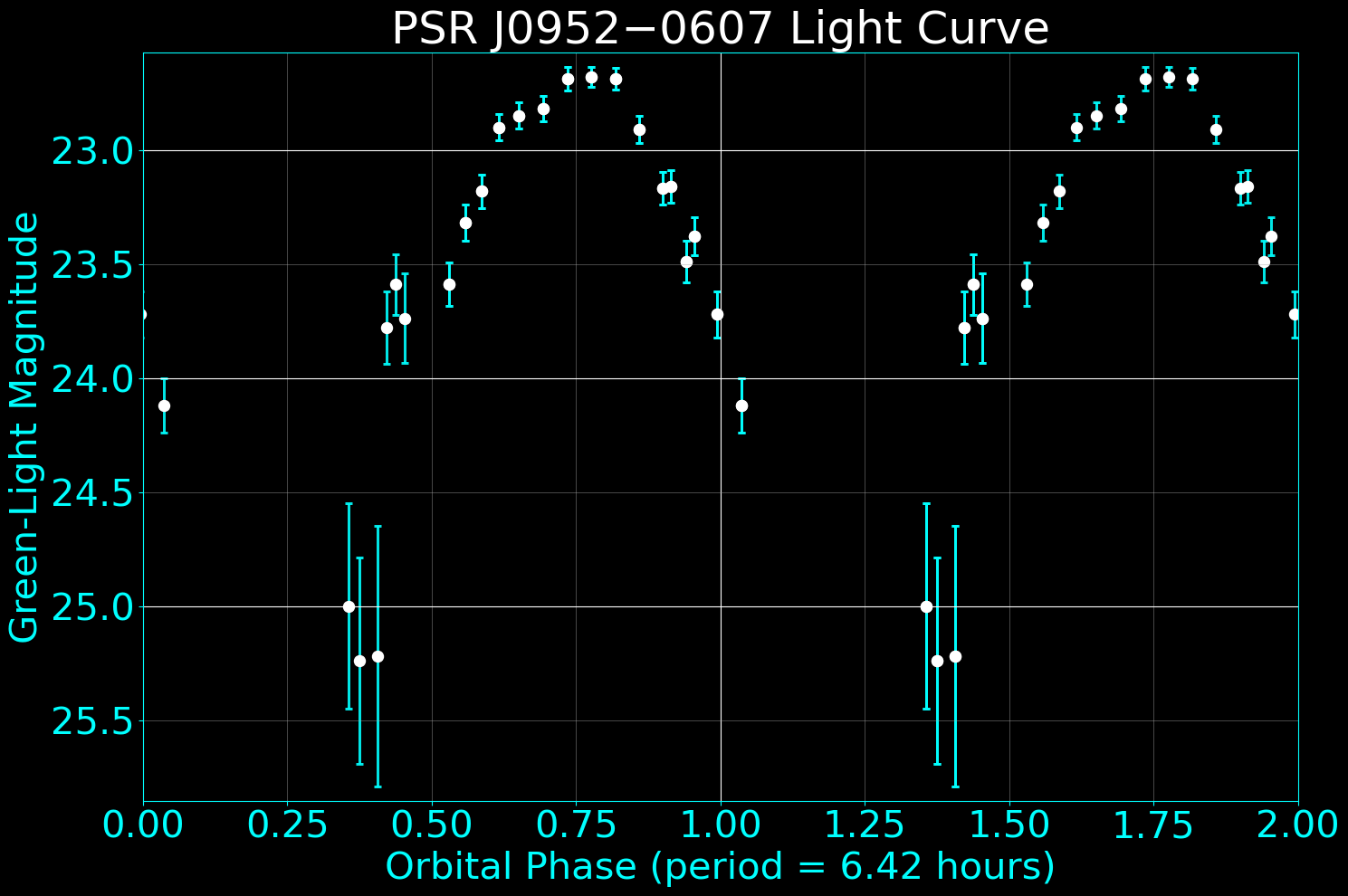
A green-light light curve for PSR J0952–0607, adapted from Draghis et al.

The companion's pulsar-facing irradiated hemisphere is continuously heated up to a temperature of 6,200 K, whereas the companion's unirradiated hemisphere experiences a uniform temperature of 3,000 K. This hemispherical temperature difference corresponds to a difference in hemisphere luminosities, which in turn causes significant variability in apparent brightness as the companion rotates around the pulsar. This brightness variability is demonstrated in PSR J0952−0607's optical light curve, which exhibits an amplitude greater than one magnitude.

== Mass ==
PSR J0952−0607 has a mass of 2.35±0.11 M_{☉}, making it the most massive neutron star known as of 2026. The pulsar likely acquired most of its mass by accreting up to 1 M_{☉} of lost material from its companion.

== Rotation and age ==
PSR J0952−0607 rotates at a frequency of 707.31 Hz (1.4137 ms period), making it the second-fastest-spinning pulsar known, and the fastest-spinning pulsar that is located in the Milky Way. Assuming a standard neutron star radius of 10 km (6.2 mi), the equator of PSR J0952−0607 rotates at a tangential velocity over 44,400 km/s (27,600 mi/s)—about 14% the speed of light. Based on 7 years of precise pulsation timing data from gamma-ray and radio observations, the pulsar's rotation period is estimated to be slowing down at a spin-down rate less than 4.6×10^{−21} seconds per second, corresponding to a characteristic age of 4.9 billion years.

== Magnetic field ==
Measurements of PSR J0952−0607's spin-down rate show that the pulsar has a remarkably weak surface magnetic field strength of 6.1×10^{7} gauss (6.1×10^{3} T), placing it among the 10 weakest pulsar magnetic fields known as of 2022. For context, ordinary pulsar magnetic fields usually lie on the order of teragauss (1×10^{12} G, 1.0×10^{8} T), over 10,000 times greater than that of PSR J0952−0607. Other millisecond pulsars exhibit similarly weak magnetic fields, hinting at a common albeit unknown mechanism in these types of systems; possible explanations range from accreted matter burying the pulsar's surface magnetic field to heat-driven evolution of the pulsar's solid crust.

== Gamma-ray emissions ==
PSR J0952−0607 appears very faint in gamma-rays and was not detected in July 2011.

== See also ==
- Tolman–Oppenheimer–Volkoff limit
- Black Widow pulsar, the prototypical namesake for the class of binary pulsars with ablating companions
- PSR J1748−2446ad, the fastest-spinning pulsar located in the globular cluster Terzan 5
