= Black Widow pulsar =

Millisecond pulsar in the constellation Sagitta

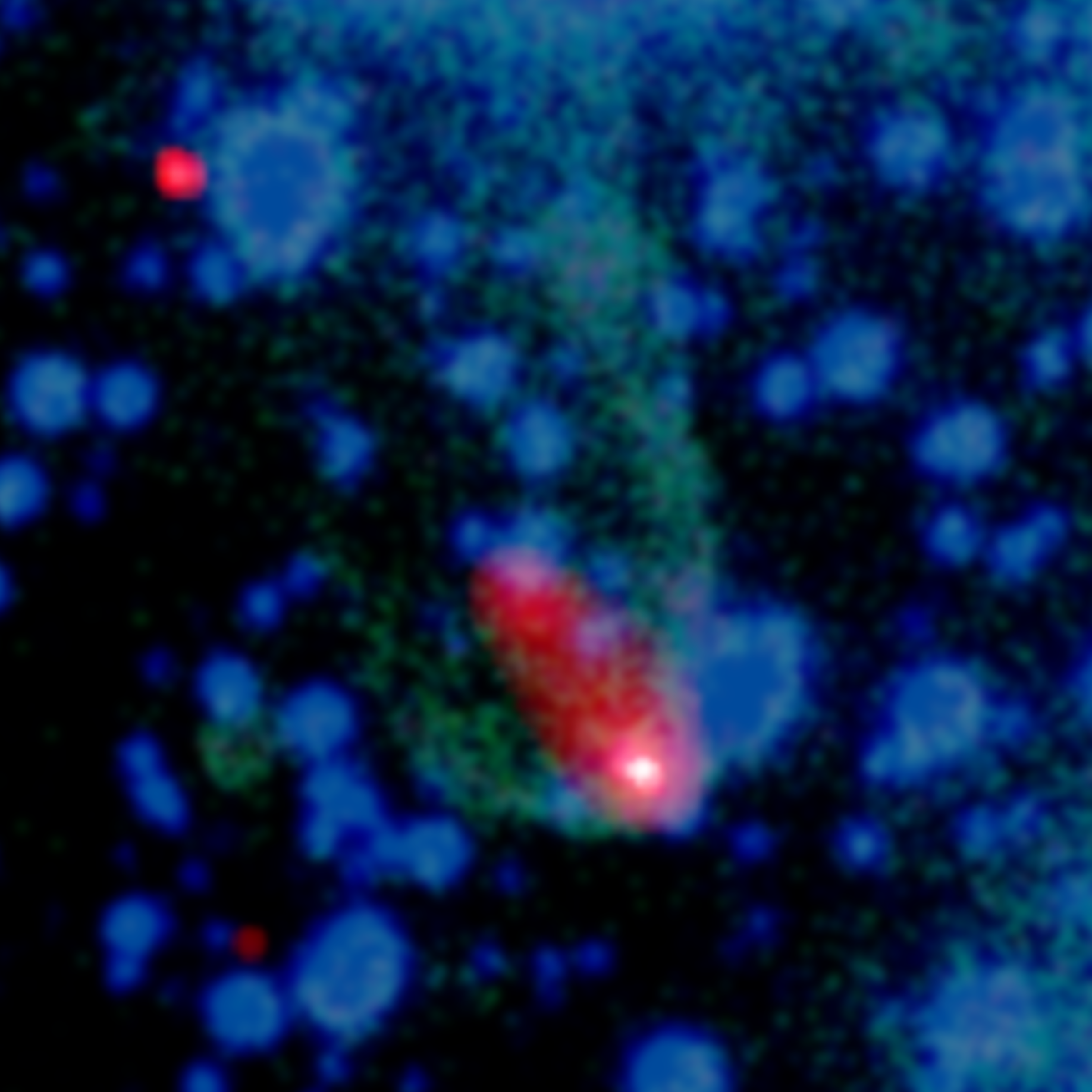
- The blue and green are optical images of the field in which the Black Widow pulsar is found, the green indicating the H-alpha bow shock. The red and white are the colors of the shock structures discovered in X-ray by the Chandra X-ray Observatory.

Observation data Epoch J2000 Equinox ICRS
- Constellation: Sagitta
- Right ascension: 19^{h} 59^{m} 36.764^{s}
- Declination: +20° 48′ 14.90″
- Apparent magnitude (V): 20.16–26.2

Astrometry
| Proper motion (μ) | RA: −19.267 mas/yr Dec.: −26.560 mas/yr |
| Parallax (π) | 1.1878±1.3556 mas |
| Distance | 6,500 ly (2,000 pc) |

Details

Pulsar
| Mass | 2.4 M_{☉} |
| Rotation | 1.60740168480632 ms |

Companion
| Mass | 0.035 M_{☉} |

Other designations
- QX Sge, PSR J1959+2048, PSR B1957+20

Database references
| SIMBAD | data |

The Black Widow pulsar (PSR B1957+20) is an eclipsing binary millisecond pulsar in the Milky Way. Discovered in 1988, it is located roughly 6,500 light-years (2,000 parsecs) away from Earth. It completes a rotation period of 1.6074 milliseconds. It is orbited by a brown dwarf or super-Jupiter companion with a period of 9.2 hours with an eclipse duration of approximately 20 minutes. When it was discovered, it was the first such pulsar known.

== Description ==
The prevailing theoretical explanation for the system implied that the companion is being destroyed by the strong powerful outflows, or winds, of high-energy particles caused by the neutron star; thus, the sobriquet black widow pulsar was applied to the object. Subsequent to this, other objects with similar features have been discovered, and the name has been applied to the class of millisecond pulsars with an ablating companion, as of February 2023 around 41 black widows are known to exist.

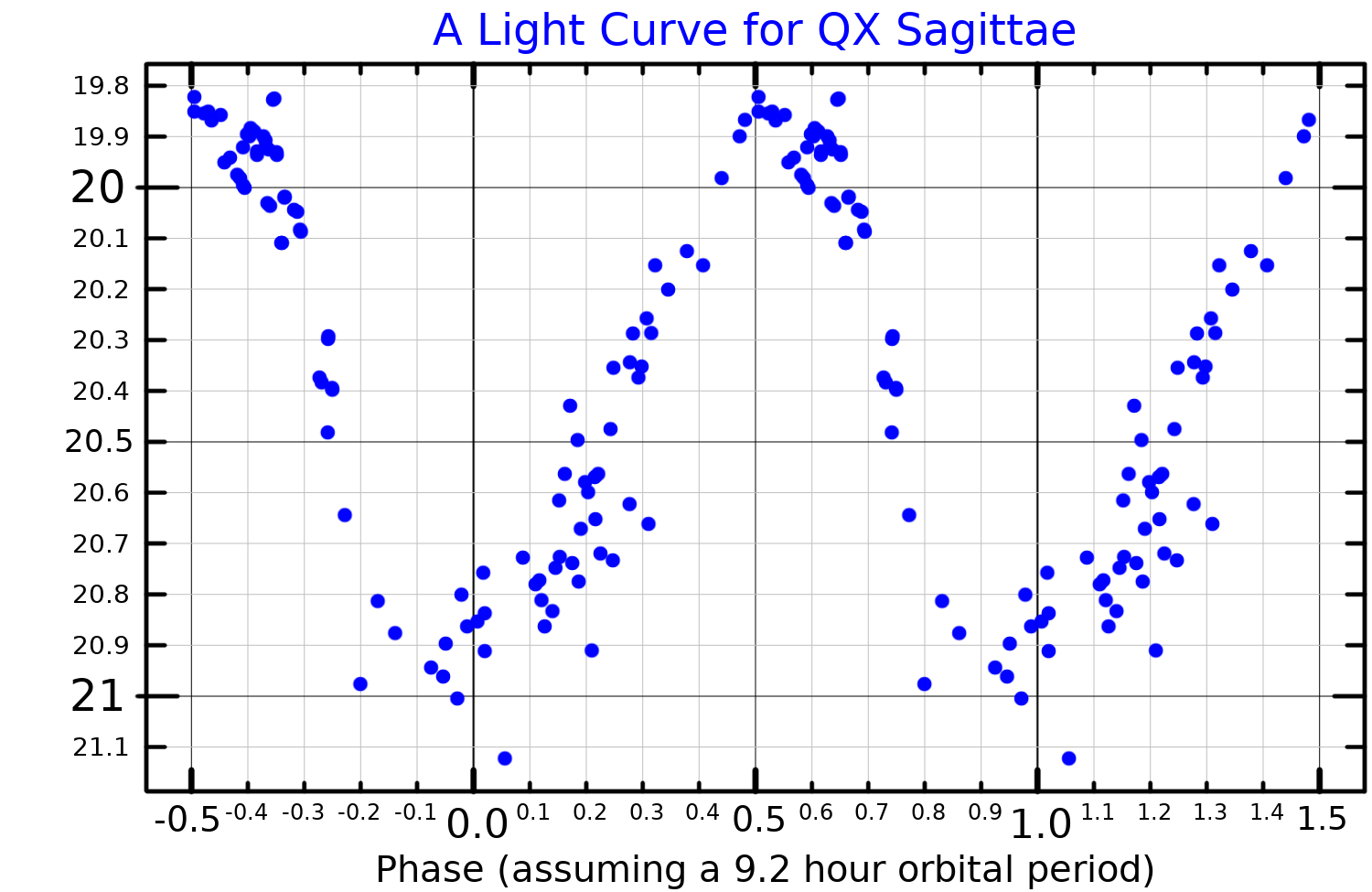
A visual-band light curve for QX Sagittae, adapted from van Paradijs et al. (1988) The light from a nearby star of similar brightness is included, and at the curve's minimum all light comes from that star.

Later observations of the object showed a bow shock in H-alpha and a smaller-in-extent shock seen in X-rays (as observed by the Chandra X-ray Observatory), indicating a forward velocity of approximately a million kilometers per hour.

In 2010, it was estimated that the neutron star's mass was at least $1.66 M_\odot$ and possibly as high as $2.4 M_\odot$ (the latter of which, if true, would surpass PSR J0740+6620 for the title of most massive neutron star yet detected and place it within range of the Tolman–Oppenheimer–Volkoff limit). In January 2023 the upper limit was revised down to $1.8 M_\odot$

== Planets ==
The pulsar has a substellar companion, possibly a brown dwarf.

The Black Widow pulsar planetary system
| Companion (in order from star) | Mass | Semimajor axis (AU) | Orbital period (days) | Eccentricity | Inclination (°) | Radius |
|---|---|---|---|---|---|---|
| b | 22 M_{J} | — | 0.38 | — | — | — |

== Gallery ==
Artist impressions of the Black Widow pulsar and an optical image of the bow shock.

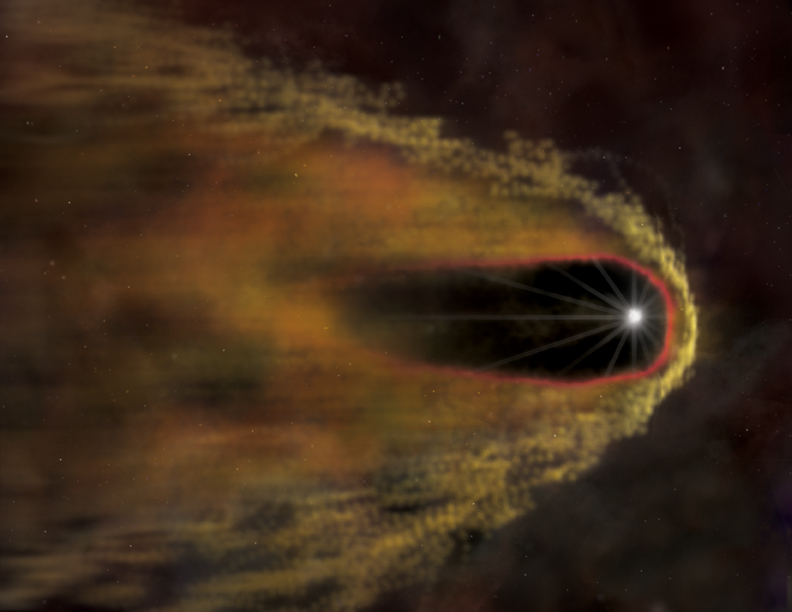
Artist's impression of the pulsar surrounded by its bow shock. White rays indicate particles of matter and antimatter being spewed from the star. Its companion star is too close to the pulsar to be visible at this scale.

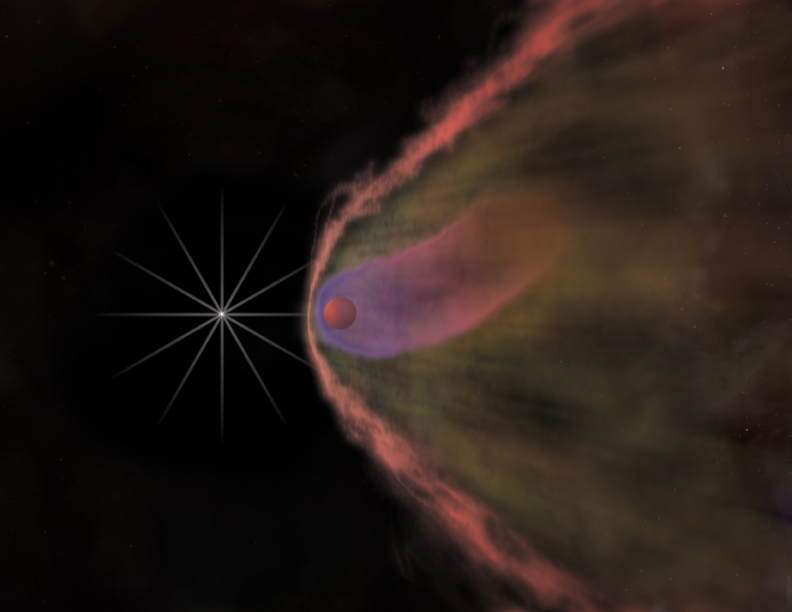
Depiction of the same pulsar one million times closer showing the effect of its wind on its companion star, which is evaporating. The bow shock is too large to be shown, and at this scale would extend more than 15 miles (24 km) beyond the edge of the computer screen.

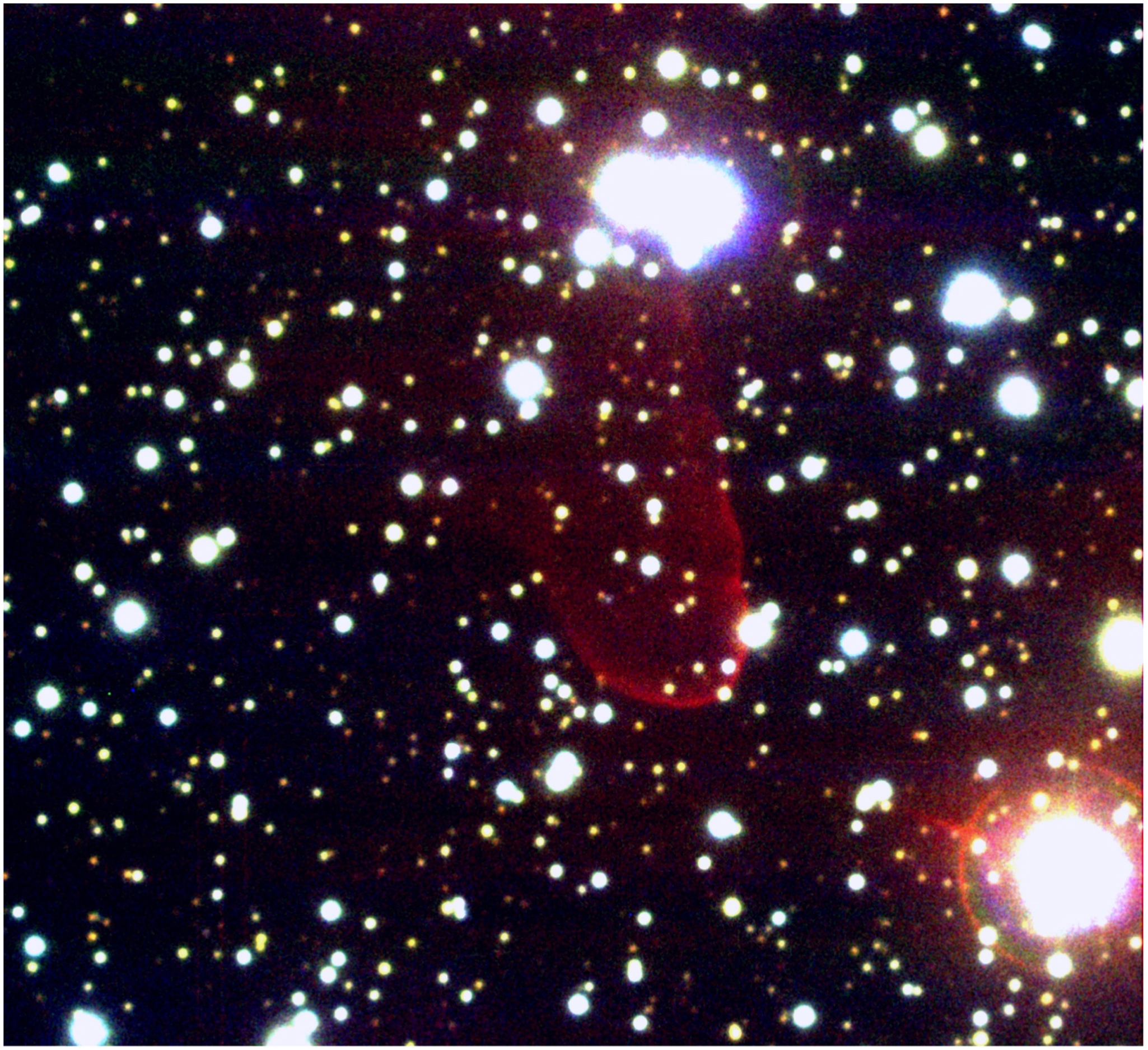
Optical image showing the H-alpha bow shock in red. The optical counterpart is a faint star near the edge of the bow shock.

== See also ==
- PSR J1544+4937
- PSR J1719−1438
