= Optical pulsar =

Astronomical object

An optical pulsar is a pulsar which can be detected in the visible spectrum. There are very few of these known: the Crab Pulsar was detected by stroboscopic techniques in 1969, shortly after its discovery in radio waves, at the Steward Observatory. The Vela Pulsar was detected in 1977 at the Anglo-Australian Observatory, and was the faintest star ever imaged at that time.

As of 2018, there are 13 recognized optical pulsars:

Name of pulsar	Magnitude (B)
Crab Pulsar (CM Tauri, PSR B0531+21)	16.5
Vela Pulsar	24
PSR B0540-69 (in the Large Magellanic Cloud)	23
PSR B0656+14	26
PSR B0633+17 (Geminga)	25.5
PSR B1509-58 (*)	25.7
PSR J1023+0038	22
PSR B1055−52	24.9
PSR B1929+10	25.6
PSR B1133+16	28
PSR B0950+08	27.1
PSR J0108−1431	26.4
PSR J0437−4715	20.98±0.09
*Source included but not discussed in paper by source paper.
