= PSR J0537−6910 =

Pulsar in the constellation Dorado

Observation data Epoch J2000 Equinox ICRS
- Constellation: Dorado
- Right ascension: 05^{h} 37^{m} 47.6^{s}
- Declination: −69° 10′ 20″

Characteristics
- Spectral type: Pulsar

Astrometry
| Distance | 170,000 ly (52,000 pc) |

Details
| Rotation | 16.1222220245 ms |
| Age | 4,930 years |

Other designations
- PSR J0537−69, CXOU J053747.3−691020, XMMU J053747.4−691020, CXOU J053747.4−691019, [CWG2006] 4.

Database references
| SIMBAD | data |

PSR J0537−6910 is a pulsar that is 4,930 years old (not including the light travel time to Earth). It is located about 170,000 light-years away, in the southern constellation of Dorado, and is located in the Large Magellanic Cloud. It rotates at 62.026 hertz (16.122 milliseconds) and is characteristic age of 4,930 years old.

A team at LANL advanced that it is possible to predict starquakes in PSR J0537−6910, meaning that it may be possible to devise a way to forecast glitches at least in some exceptional pulsars. The same team observed magnetic pole drift on this pulsar with observational data from Rossi X-ray Timing Explorer.

== See also ==
- Supernova
- LHA 120-N 157B
