= Radio star =

Type of stellar object

Stellar radio sources, radio source stars or radio stars are stellar objects that produce copious emissions of various radio frequencies, whether constant or pulsed. Radio emissions from stars can be produced in many varied ways.

== Among neutron stars ==
Pulsars, a type of neutron star, are examples of radio stars. Rotation-powered pulsars are, as the name suggests, powered by the slow-down of their rotation. The rotation powers a magnetic field, which generates the radio emissions. Not all rotation-powered pulsars generate their pulses in the radio spectrum. Some of them, from the millisecond pulsars, generate X-rays instead. Aside from radio pulsars and X-ray pulsars, there are also gamma ray pulsars, which are mostly magnetars. Some radio pulsars are also optical pulsars.

Aside from pulsars, another type of neutron star is also characterized by radio emissions: the rotating radio transient (RRAT). As suggested by the name, the radio emission is erratic.

== Quasars are not radio stars ==
Quasars (quasi-stellar radio sources) are not radio stars. They also emit radio frequencies, but from the effects of supermassive black holes at the centre of galaxies. Although they appear to be stars, they are not stars, but the hyperactive heart of a galaxy.

== By other stellar objects ==
Astrophysical masers

Some late-type stars can produce astrophysical masers from their atmospheres and beam out coherent bursts of microwaves.

The Sun

The Sun, the nearest star to Earth, is known to emit radio waves, though it is virtually the only regular star that has been detected in the radio spectrum, because it is so close. It is not considered a radio star because it is not a strong radio source.

Main-sequence stars in general

Some studies have found that main-sequence stars may extremely rarely emit radio waves. A 2009 survey found a maximum of 112 candidate radio stars cross-matching the FIRST and NVSS surveys, but estimated that 108 ± 13 of the samples are from "contamination" from background sources. They estimate that less than 1.2 in 1 million stars between an apparent magnitude of 15 and 19.1 emit more than 1.25 mJy in the 21-centimeter band.

Fast radio bursts

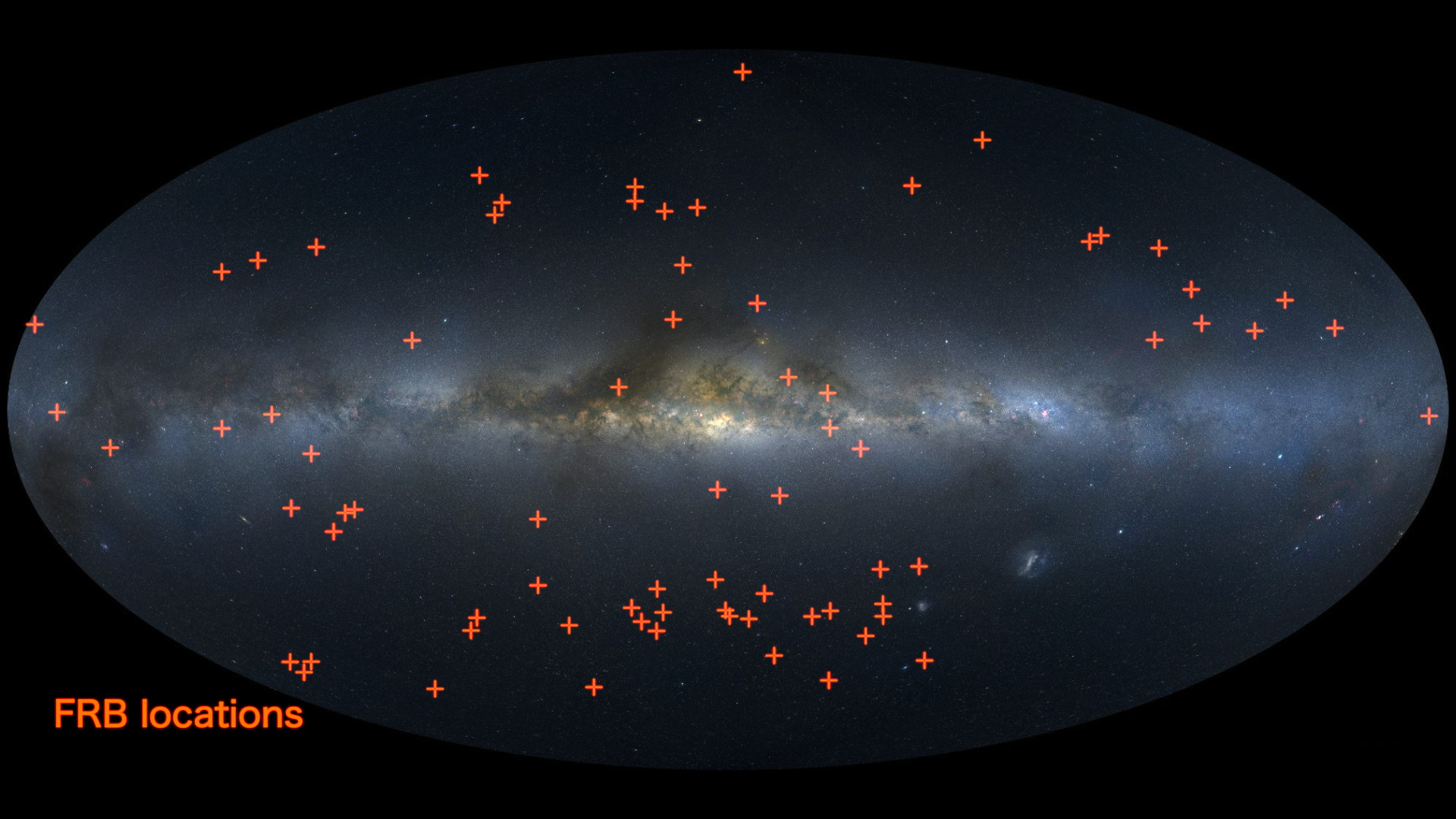

Fast radio bursts (FRB) are hypothesized to originate from extra-galactic sources. These bright, brief emissions of ~1 GHz radio occur at the rate of 10^{4} per day across the sky, and no emission counterparts have been found in other bands. An alternative scenario is that FRBs are emitted as the result of flare activity on nearby stars within a kiloparsec of the Sun. This would make it easier to explain the luminosity of these events.

Red dwarfs

In 2020, 10 days before reports about BLC1 – reported to be an apparent possible radio signal from Proxima Centauri, astronomers reported "a bright, long-duration optical flare, accompanied by a series of intense, coherent radio bursts" from the nearest star to the Sun. They state that it constitutes the "most compelling detection of a solar-like radio burst from another star to date" and strongly indicates a causal relationship between these emissions.

Like BLC1, the signal was recorded in April and May 2019. Despite this, their finding has not been put in direct relation to the BLC1 signal by scientists or media outlets as of January 2021 but implies that planets around Proxima Centauri and other red dwarfs are likely to be rather uninhabitable for humans and other currently known organisms.
