= PSR J0540−6919 =

Pulsar in the constellation Dorado

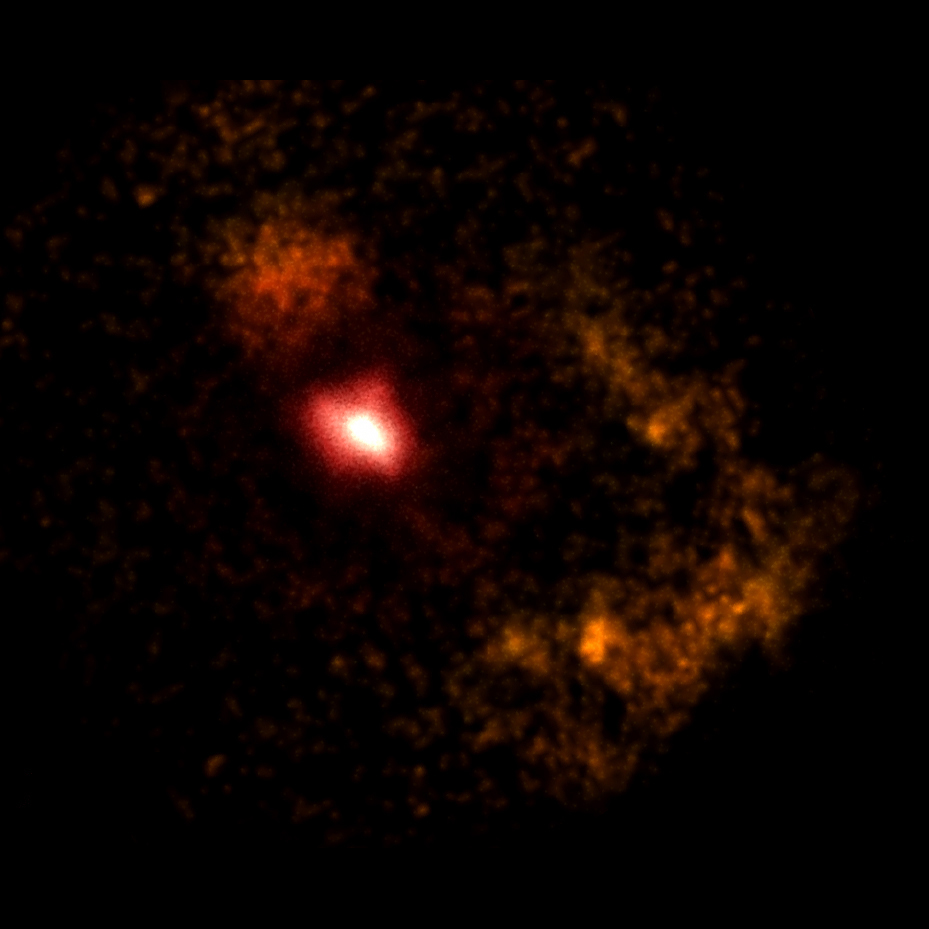
- PSR B0540-69 and its surrounding supernova remnant imaged by the Chandra X-ray Observatory

Observation data Epoch J2000.0 Equinox ICRS
- Constellation: Dorado
- Right ascension: 05^{h} 40^{m} 10.84^{s}
- Declination: −69° 19′ 54.2″
- Apparent magnitude (V): 22.0

Characteristics
- Spectral type: Pulsar

Astrometry
Proper motion (μ)	RA: 3.593 mas/yr Dec.: 4.971 mas/yr
Parallax (π)	0.6715 mas
Distance	161,000 ly (49,400 pc)

Details
Rotation	50.5697030222 ms
Age	1,670 years

Other designations
- PSR B0540−69, PKS 0540−693

Database references
SIMBAD	data

PSR J0540−6919 (PSR B0540−69) is a pulsar in the Tarantula Nebula of the Large Magellanic Cloud. It is the first extragalactic gamma-ray pulsar discovered. A rotation period of 50.569 milliseconds and is characteristic age of 1,670 years old.

== History ==
This Crab-like pulsar was first discovered in X-rays in 1984 and subsequently detected at radio wavelengths. Astronomers initially attributed the glow to collisions of subatomic particles accelerated in the shock waves produced by supernova explosions, and it took more than six years of observations by Fermi's Large Area Telescope to detect gamma-ray pulsations from PSR J0540−6919.

In 2015, it was determined that PSR J0540−6919 is responsible for about half of the gamma-ray flux from the Tarantula Nebula in the Large Magellanic Cloud. It was identified as a bright source of gamma radiation early in the Fermi mission.

== See also ==
- Gamma-ray burst
