= PSR B0329+54 =

Pulsar in the constellation Camelopardalis

Observation data Epoch J2000 Equinox ICRS
- Constellation: Camelopardalis
- Right ascension: 03^{h} 32^{m} 59.368^{s}
- Declination: +54° 34′ 43.57″

Characteristics
- Evolutionary stage: Pulsar

Astrometry
Proper motion (μ)	RA: 16.960 mas/yr Dec.: -10.382 mas/yr
Parallax (π)	0.611±0.013 mas
Distance	5,300 ± 100 ly (1,640 ± 30 pc)

Details
Rotation	0.714519699726 s
Age	5 Myr

Other designations
- NVSS J033259+543444, PSR B0329+54, PSR J0332+5434, TXS 0329+544, PULS CP 0329, 2MASS J03325936+5434448

Database references
SIMBAD	data
Exoplanet Archive	data

PSR B0329+54 is a pulsar approximately 5,300 light-years away in the constellation of Camelopardalis. It completes one rotation every 0.7145 seconds and is approximately 5 million years old.

The emissions of this pulsar and the Vela Pulsar were converted into audible sound by the French composer Gérard Grisey, and used as such in the piece Le noir de l'étoile (1989–90).

== Planetary system ==
In 1979 and 1994, two exoplanets were reported to be orbiting the pulsar (being classified as pulsar planets). Later observations did not support this conclusion. More recently, a 2017 analysis indicated that a different long-period pulsar planet remains a possibility, but this was subsequently challenged as well. As of 2025, the existence of any planet around this pulsar remains in doubt.

The PSR B0329+54 planetary system
Companion (in order from star)	Mass	Semimajor axis (AU)	Orbital period (years)	Eccentricity	Inclination (°)	Radius
b (disputed)	1.97 ± 0.19 M_{🜨}	10.26 ± 0.07	27.76 ± 0.03	0.236 ± 0.011	—	—

== See also ==
- PSR B1257+12
- PSR J1719−1438
