= PSR J0437−4715 =

Pulsar in the constellation Pictor

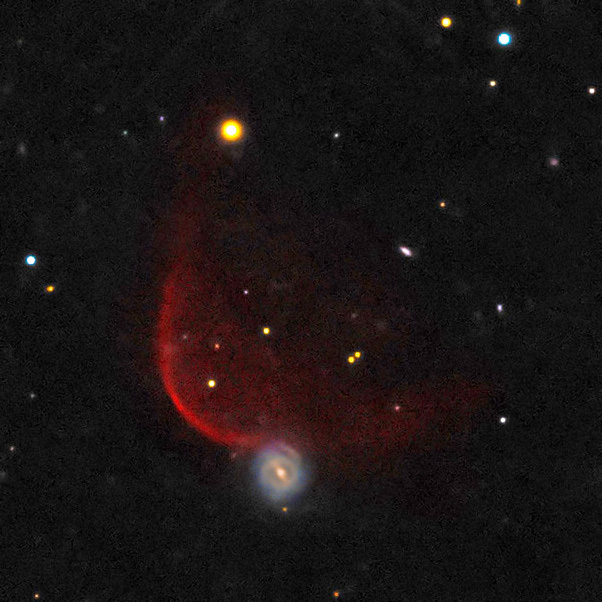
- Bow shock nebula around the millisecond pulsar PSR J0437−4715

Observation data Epoch J2000 Equinox J2000
- Constellation: Pictor
- Right ascension: 04^{h} 37^{m} 15.81476^{s}
- Declination: −47° 15′ 08.6242″
- Apparent magnitude (V): 20.98±0.09

Characteristics
- Spectral type: Pulsar

Astrometry
Proper motion (μ)	RA: 121.453 mas/yr Dec.: 71.457 mas/yr
Distance	509.8 ly (156.3 pc)

Details
Mass	1.418±0.037 M_{☉}
Radius	11.36+0.95 −0.63 km
Rotation	5.757451941593412 ms
Age	1.59 Gyr

Other designations
- PSR B0435−47, 1RXS J043714.5−471503

Database references
SIMBAD	data

PSR J0437−4715 is a pulsar. Discovered in the Parkes 70 cm survey, it remains the closest and brightest millisecond pulsar (MSP) known. The pulsar rotates about its axis 173.68 times per second and therefore completes a rotation every 5.7574 milliseconds. It emits a searchlight-like radio beam that sweeps past the Earth each time it rotates. Until the Gaia mission, it was the most precisely located object outside of the Solar System, recorded in 2008 at 156.3±1.3 parsecs or 509.8±4.2 light-years distant.

This pulsar is distinguished by being the most stable natural clock known and is debatably more stable than man-made atomic clocks. Its stability is about one part in 10^{15}. Two other pulsars, PSR B1855+09 and PSR B1937+21, are known to be comparable in stability to atomic clocks, or about 3 parts in 10^{14}.

PSR J0437−4715 is the first MSP to have its X-ray emission detected and studied in detail. It is also the first of only two pulsars to have the full three-dimensional orientation of its orbit determined.

Optical observations indicate that the binary companion of PSR J0437-4715 is most likely a low-mass helium white dwarf. The pulsar is about 1.4 solar mass (M_{☉}) and the companion is about 0.25 M_{☉}. The pair revolve around each other every 5.741 days in nearly perfect circular orbits.

== See also ==
- Binary pulsar
- Pulsar
