= Richard V. E. Lovelace =

American astrophysicist and plasma physicist

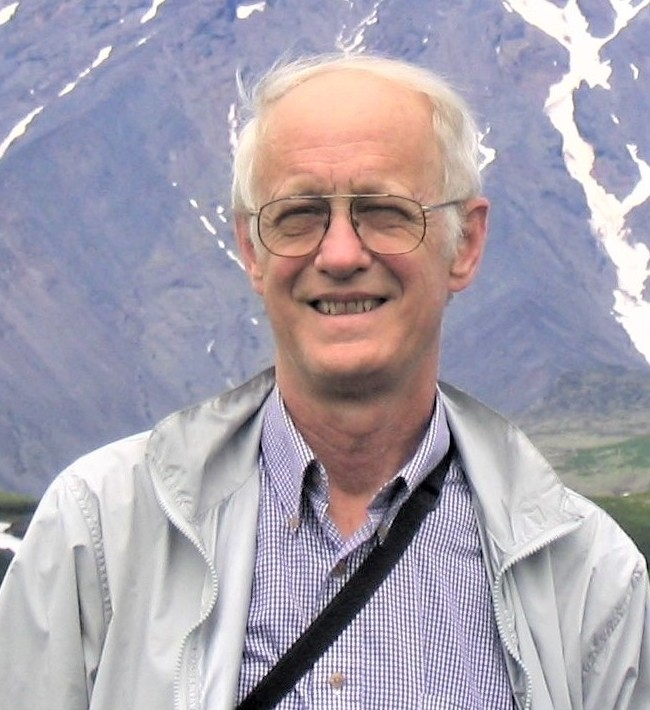
- Lovelace in 2004
- Education: Washington University in St. Louis, Cornell University
- Known for: Discovery of the period of the pulsar in the Crab Nebula (Crab Pulsar)
- Children: Two
- Scientific career
- Workplaces: Cornell University
- Thesis: Theory and analysis of interplanetary scintillations

Richard Van Evera Lovelace is an American astrophysicist and plasma physicist. He is best known for the discovery of the period of the pulsar in the Crab Nebula (Crab Pulsar), which helped to prove that pulsars are rotating neutron stars, for developing a magnetic model of astrophysical jets from galaxies, and for developing a model of Rossby waves in accretion disks. He organized a US-Russia collaboration in plasma astrophysics, which focused on modeling of plasma accretion and outflows from magnetized rotating stars.

== Early life and education ==
Lovelace is the son of city planner Eldridge Lovelace and Marjorie Van Evera Lovelace. He graduated from Washington University in St. Louis in 1964 with a BS in physics and after receiving a National Science Foundation fellowship earned his PhD from Cornell University in 1970, also in physics, with a dissertation titled Theory and analysis of interplanetary scintillations.

== Career ==
Lovelace began his career as a research associate at the U.S. Naval Research Laboratory and the Cornell University Laboratory of Plasma Studies. In 1972 he became an assistant professor at Cornell, and in 1984 a full professor. He spent a year as a visiting scientist at the Princeton University Plasma Physics Laboratory in the 1970s and in 1990 was a visiting professor at the University of Texas at Austin on a Guggenheim Fellowship. He was elected an overseas fellow at Churchill College, Cambridge University, and visiting scientist at the Institute of Astronomy, Cambridge, and in 1999 was Orsan Anderson Visiting Scholar at Los Alamos National Laboratory. He has a joint appointment at Cornell in the Astronomy and Applied Engineering Physics departments, and directed the Master of Engineering Program from 1991 to 2000. He was awarded the Excellence in Teaching Prize of the engineering honor society Tau Beta Pi in 1988.

He became a fellow of the American Physical Society in 2000, was divisional associate editor for Physical Review Letters for Plasma Physics from 1997 to 2000, in 2003 became associate editor of Physics of Plasmas, and in 2010 became an editorial board member of Journal of Computational Astrophysics and Cosmology. He was a member of the James Clerk Maxwell Prize for Plasma Physics committee of the American Physical Society in 2009-2011 and a member of the Advisory board of the Guggenheim Fellowship Foundation from 1994 to 2005.

== Research ==
In 1968, Lovelace and his collaborators discovered a rapidly pulsing radio source, the Crab Pulsar, measuring its period to be approximately 33 milliseconds. As a graduate student working at Arecibo Observatory, Lovelace developed a version of the Fast Fourier transform program which was adapted to run on the Arecibo Observatory's CDC 3200 computer. This program helped to separate the periodic pulsar signal from the noise, and one night he discovered the period of the Crab Pulsar. A few weeks earlier, observers from the National Radio Astronomy Observatory reported about two pulsating sources near the Crab Nebula, with no evident periodicities. Lovelace and collaborators found that one of pulsars (the NP 0532) is located in the center of the Crab Nebula and found its period with a high precision: 33.09 ms.

This was the fastest pulsar found at that time. This discovery helped to prove the idea that pulsars were rotating neutron stars. Before that, many scientists believed that pulsars were pulsating white dwarfs or neutron stars.

In 1976 Lovelace proposed a model of jets from magnetized disks surrounding massive black holes in galaxies. The model is based on the dynamo mechanism acting in the magnetized accretion disk surrounding a black hole or other gravitating object. The idea of the magnetically-driven jets and winds has been cited by the astronomical community.

He also developed the theory of scintillations in the interstellar medium and discovered the Kolmogorov nature of the turbulence in the solar wind.

Lovelace proposed the Rossby wave instability in accretion disks These waves form anti-cyclonic vortices in accretion discs, where dust particles accumulate and may form planets. He developed a theory of the stability of electron and ion rings which has been used in plasma fusion experiments at Cornell.

Lovelace also has significant contributions to plasma physics. He developed the theory of the stability of electron and ion rings. Lovelace developed a pioneering theory of intense ion beams in pulsed diodes, which are currently used in laboratories. He also proposed the theory of magnetic insulation, which is used in laboratories. Lovelace invented a trapping mechanism of spin-polarized neutral gas, which has been experimentally demonstrated.

== Personal life ==
As of 2008 Lovelace was married; he has two daughters (Jennifer & Evera). He lives in Ithaca, New York.
