= PSR B1937+21 =

Pulsar in the constellation Vulpecula

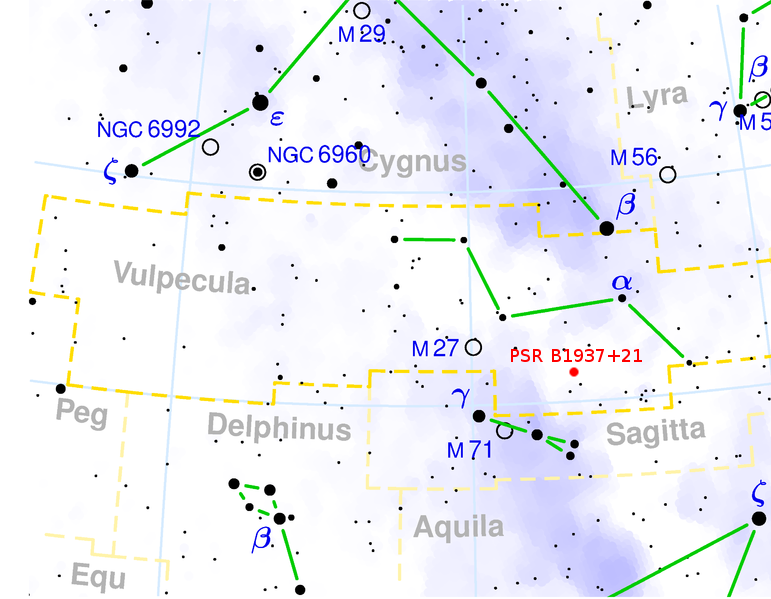
- Vulpecula constellation, with the position of PSR B1937+21 marked in red.

Observation data Epoch J2000 Equinox ICRS
- Constellation: Vulpecula
- Right ascension: 19^{h} 39^{m} 38.560210^{s}
- Declination: +21° 34′ 59.14166″

Characteristics
- Spectral type: Pulsar

Astrometry
Proper motion (μ)	RA: -0.130 mas/yr Dec.: -0.464 mas/yr
Parallax (π)	<0.28±0.08 mas
Distance	>11,500 ly (>3,600 pc)

Details
Rotation	1.557806567041489 ms
Age	2.29 × 10^{8} years

Other designations
- PSR B1937+21, 4C21.53, PSR J1939+2134

Database references
SIMBAD	data

PSR B1937+21 is a pulsar located in the constellation Vulpecula a few degrees in the sky away from the first discovered pulsar, PSR B1919+21. The name PSR B1937+21 is derived from the word "pulsar" and the declination and right ascension at which it is located, with the "B" indicating that the coordinates are for the 1950.0 epoch. PSR B1937+21 was discovered in 1982 by Don Backer, Shri Kulkarni, Carl Heiles, Michael Davis and Miller Goss.

It is the first discovered millisecond pulsar, with a rotational period of 1.5578 milliseconds, meaning it completes 641.92 rotations per second. This period was far shorter than astronomers considered pulsars capable of reaching, and led to the suggestion that pulsars can be spun up by accreting mass from a companion.

The rotation of PSR B1937+21, along with other millisecond pulsars discovered later, are very stable in their rotation. They are capable of keeping time as well as atomic clocks. PSR B1937+21 is unusual in that it is one of few pulsars which occasionally emits particularly strong pulses. The flux density of the giant pulses emitted by PSR B1937+21 are the brightest radio emission ever observed. These properties of PSR B1937+21, and its unexpected discovery, are credited with helping revitalize research on pulsars.

== Background ==
Schematic view of a pulsar. The sphere in the middle represents the neutron star, the curves indicate the magnetic field lines and the protruding cones represent the emission beams.

The first pulsar was discovered in 1967 by Jocelyn Bell and her PhD supervisor Antony Hewish using the Interplanetary Scintillation Array. Shortly after the discovery of pulsars, Franco Pacini and Thomas Gold independently suggested that pulsars are highly magnetized rotating neutron stars, which form as a result of a supernova at the end of the life of stars more massive than about 10 times the mass of the Sun. The radiation emitted by pulsars is caused by interaction of the plasma surrounding the neutron star with its rapidly rotating magnetic field. This interaction leads to emission "in the pattern of a rotating beacon," as emission escapes along the magnetic poles of the neutron star. The "rotating beacon" property of pulsars arises from the misalignment of their magnetic poles with their rotational poles.

== Discovery ==
In the late 1970s, the radio source 4C21.53 captured the attention of radio astronomers, "because of its anomalously high level of interplanetary scintillation." As interplanetary scintillation is associated with compact radio sources, the interplanetary scintillation observations suggested that 4C21.53 might be a supernova remnant, but a pulsar survey carried out at Arecibo Observatory in 1974 by Russell Hulse and Joseph Taylor in the region did not discover a pulsar associated with 4C21.53. With the lack of success in finding a pulsar in the region, other explanations for the scintillation were explored, including suggestion of entirely new classes of objects. After realizing in 1982 that previous searches for a pulsar in the region of 4C21.53 were not sensitive to periods short enough to produce the observed scintillation, Don Backer initiated a search in the area that would be sensitive to a wide range of pulse periods and dispersion measures, including very short periods. The initial search plan was to sample at a rate of 500 Hz, which would have been insufficiently fast to detect a pulsar spinning at 642 Hz. To simplify the search apparatus, Backer's then student, Shri Kulkarni, sampled as quickly as was possible, and time averaged the signal over a period of 0.4 milliseconds, thus effectively sampling at 2500 Hz. As a result, Backer et al. determined in November 1982 that the source was a pulsar rotating every 1.5578 milliseconds, a rate far beyond anything that astronomers studying pulsars had expected.

== Characteristics ==
=== Age and spin-down rate ===
When Backer et al. reported their finding in November 1982, they found that the rotation period of PSR B1937+21 was increasing at a rate of 3 × 10^{-14} seconds per second. Pulsars are expected to slow over time, as the energy that they emit is ultimately drawn from the rotational energy of the pulsar. Using the initially observed values for the period and spin-down rate, and assuming a minimum period of 0.5 milliseconds for pulsars, the maximum age for PSR B1937+21 was found to be about 750 million years old. The estimate of the minimum possible period is obtained from the centrifugal break-up limit, which is the rotational period at which the centrifugal force and the self-gravity of the pulsar are equal. The value of the minimum rotational period depends upon the neutron star equation of state, with different models giving values between 0.3 and 1 millisecond, which corresponds to a rotation frequency of 1 to 3 kilohertz. There may be mechanisms such as gravitational radiation which keep the pulsar from reaching this absolute limit, but pulsars can spin no faster.

An age of no more than 750 million years for the PSR B1937+21 was at odds with the observations of the region in other wavelengths. No optical supernova remnant, nor bright x-ray source, had been observed in the vicinity of the PSR B1937+21. If PSR B1937+21 was that young, it would not have had time to move far from the site at which it formed. As neutron stars are formed as the result of supernova explosions, evidence of the explosion should be nearby for a young pulsar. If it was that young, it would also be expected to still be hot, in which case the thermal radiation from PSR B1937+21 would be observable at x-ray wavelengths. Venkatraman Radhakrishnan and G. Srinivasan used the lack of observed supernova remnant to argue that PSR B1937+21 had not formed with such a fast period, but instead had been "spun up" by a companion star which essentially gave the pulsar its angular momentum, a mechanism now generally used to explain millisecond pulsars. They also made a theoretical estimate of the necessary spin-down rate to be 1 × 10^{-19} seconds per second. Backer et al. revised their estimate of the upper limit of the spin-down rate just a month after the initial discovery, to 1 × 10^{-15} seconds per second, but the currently measured value is more nearly in line with the theoretical estimate, at 1.05 × 10^{-19} seconds per second. The age of PSR B1937+21 was also later determined to be 2.29 × 10^{8} years, a value which is consistent with the observational evidence.

The companion which is supposed to have spun-up PSR B1937+21 is no longer present, making it one of few millisecond pulsars which does not have a stellar mass companion. The generally high occurrence of companions to millisecond pulsars is to be expected, considering a companion is necessary to spin-up millisecond pulsars to their short periods. However, millisecond pulsars do not actively accrete matter from a companion, but instead need to have only done this at some time in the past, and thus the lack of companion for PSR B1937+21 is not seen as a being in disagreement with the spin-up model. Possible mechanisms for creating isolated millisecond pulsars include evaporation of the donor star or tidal disruption of the system.

=== Pulses ===
During one period of rotation for PSR B1937+21, there are two peaks observed, known as the pulse and interpulse. PSR B1937+21 is unusual among pulsars in that it occasionally produces pulses far brighter than an average pulse. Until 1995, the sole other pulsar known to produce giant pulses was the Crab Pulsar, and by 2006, there were 11 pulsars that had been observed to produce giant pulses out of more than 1,500 known pulsars. The giant pulses of PSR B1937+21 were first observed in 1984, shortly after its discovery, but difficulty in observing single pulses of PSR B1937+21 due to its fast period meant that the pulses were not studied in more depth until a decade after they were first observed. In more recent follow up observations, more giant pulses have been found. These giant pulses have been observed to occur at the trailing edge of both the pulse and interpulse. The duration of these giant pulses is short compared to the period of the pulsar, lasting on the order of 10 nanoseconds. The flux density of observed pulses is somewhat variable, but has been observed to be as high as 6.5×10^{−22} W m^{−2}Hz^{−1} (6.5×10^{4} janskys). The brightness temperature of a pulse with such high flux density and such low duration exceeds 5 × 10^{39} kelvins, making the pulses of PSR B1937+21 the brightest radio emission ever observed. PSR B1937+21 is intrinsically the most luminous millisecond pulsar. In addition to the radio pulses observed, pulses have been detected at x-ray wavelengths, which show the same pulse and interpulse pattern.

== Evidence for companions ==
After the discovery of planetary mass companions around PSR B1257+12 in 1990 by Aleksander Wolszczan, data for PSR B1937+21 and other pulsars were analyzed for the presence of similar companions. By 1994, an upper limit of about one thousandth of the mass of Earth was determined for any companion of PSR B1937+21 within 2 astronomical units. In 1999, Aleksander Wolszczan reported variations in the times of arrival of pulses from PSR B1937+21, as well as previous analysis by Tokio Fukushima which suggested that these timing variations could be caused by a dwarf planet around the pulsar. The data were consistent with a companion having a mass similar to Ceres and located at 2.71 astronomical units from the pulsar, but data over a longer period of time are required in order to verify the proposed companion. More recent observations have not detected any regular periodic signal associated with this companion, but argue that the slight variations in pulse arrival times are consistent with an asteroid belt having a total mass less than 0.05 that of the Earth, but acknowledge that the detection of periodicity in pulse timing variations associated with individual asteroids is necessary to confirm the possible asteroid belt.

== Significance ==
Until the discovery of PSR J1748-2446ad in 2006, which spins 716 times per second, PSR B1937+21 was the fastest spinning neutron star known. At the time of its discovery, PSR B1937+21 extended the range of periods observed in pulsars by a factor of 20, it also extended the range of magnetic fields observed by a factor of 100, with a magnetic field of 4.2 × 10^{8} gauss (42 kT).

As the first discovered millisecond pulsar, PSR B1937+21 "sparked a 'theory frenzy'" by providing a new laboratory in which to study pulsars, neutron stars more generally, and perhaps even some other astrophysical problems such as gravitational waves. For instance, as the density required to spin at such high rates are comparable to nuclear densities, the fastest spinning millisecond pulsars are important in understanding how matter behaves at such densities. The initially high estimate of the spin-down rate was also intriguing, as it implied a signal that could be directly detected by gravitational wave detectors, but the actual spin-down rate put the expected signal below the sensitivity of current detectors. The currently accepted value spin-down rate corresponds to a change in the rotational period of 1.5 Hz over the course of one million years. The stability of rotation of PSR B1937+21 is of the same order of the stability of the best atomic clocks, and is thus a tool used in establishing ephemeris time.

The discovery of B1937+21 launched "extensive pulsar surveys at all major radio observatories" and "happened to revitalize pulsar astronomy at a time when most people thought the field was moribund."
