= PSR B1931+24 =

Pulsar in the constellation Vulpecula

Observation data Epoch J2000.0 Equinox ICRS
- Constellation: Vulpecula
- Right ascension: 19^{h} 33^{m} 37.83^{s}
- Declination: +24° 36′ 39.6″

Characteristics
- Spectral type: Pulsar

Astrometry
Distance	15,133.66 ly (4,640 pc)

Details
Rotation	0.81369030283 s
Age	1.59 Myr

Other designations
- PSR J1933+2421

Database references
SIMBAD	data

PSR B1931+24 is a pulsar located 4.64 kiloparsecs from the Earth in the constellation Vulpecula, with a rotational period of 0.8136 seconds and an estimated age of 1.59 million years. It was discovered in 1985 with the National Radio Astronomy Observatory's Green Bank Telescope, but its intermittent properties were not discovered until 13 years later at Jodrell Bank Observatory. It is the first intermittent radio pulsar ever discovered, regularly emitting pulses for 5-10 days, before stopping for 25-35 days. Its rotation slows down at a 50% greater rate while emitting pulses. In 2025, it was discovered that PSR B1931+24 did not completely cease emissions when not pulsing, but released weak emissions and occasional dwarf pulses.

It is one of two pulsars known to stop pulsing for more than a few minutes, with the other being PSR J1841−0500 which stopped pulsing for 580 days.
