= Pulsar clock =

Clock based on pulsar radio beams

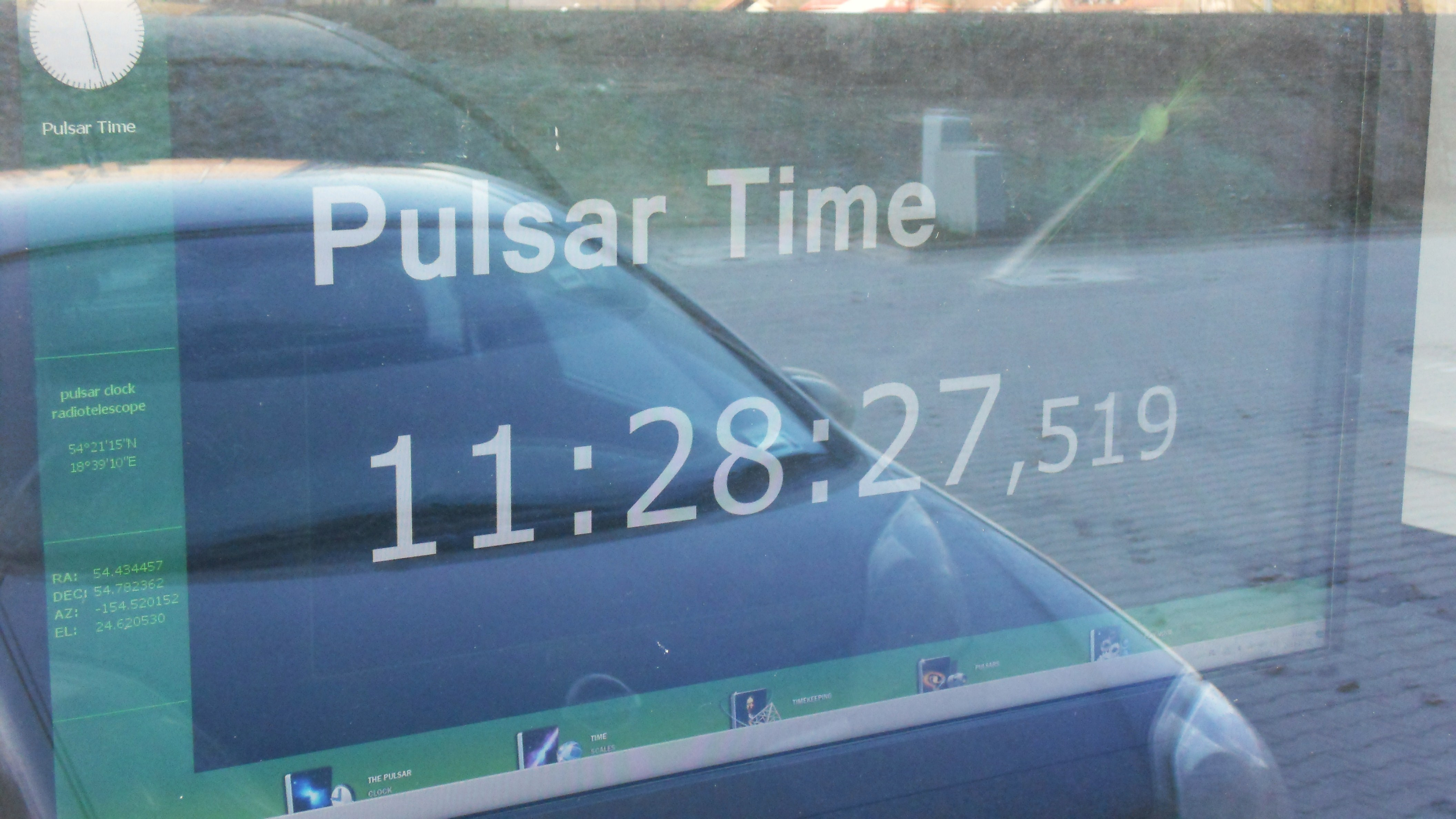
- A screen displaying pulsar time as measured in Gdańsk
- Classification: Clock
- Uses: Extremely accurate time measurement
- Inventor: Several designers funded by the Gdańsk Museum

A pulsar clock is an extremely accurate clock which functions by measuring radio pulses emitted by pulsars. Currently, only one such clock exists and is located in a church in Gdańsk, Poland, with a repeater in the building of the European Parliament in Brussels.

== Pulsar clock in Gdańsk ==
The first, and currently only, existing pulsar clock in the world was constructed in Gdańsk, in St. Catherine's Church, in 2011, with its primary goal being verifying and possibly surpassing the accuracy of atomic clocks. It receives radio pulses from pulsars by way of a dipole antenna accompanying a radiotelescope mounted on the bell tower of St. Catherine's Church.

It was created due to the initiative of the Gdańsk Museum and built by a team of scientists, including Grzegorz Szychliński, the head of the Museum of Clock Towers of the Gdańsk Museum, electrical engineers Dariusz Samek and Mirosław Owczynnik from the company EKO Elektronik, and Eugeniusz Pazderski, an astronomer from the Nicolaus Copernicus University in Toruń.

Another goal of the clock is to create a pulsar-based timescale surpassing the accuracy of all atomic clocks. Its place of construction was chosen to be Gdańsk for various reasons, including the city being home to noted selenographer and astronomer Johannes Hevelius, claimed to be one of the pioneers of the pendulum clock. Alluding to this, the clock began measuring time on his 400th birthday. On 5 October 2011, in the building of the European Parliament, located in Brussels, a repeater of the original clock in Gdańsk was installed.
