= St. Catherine's Church, Gdańsk =

St. Catherine's Church
- Polish: Kościół rektorski pw. św. Katarzyny w Gdańsku
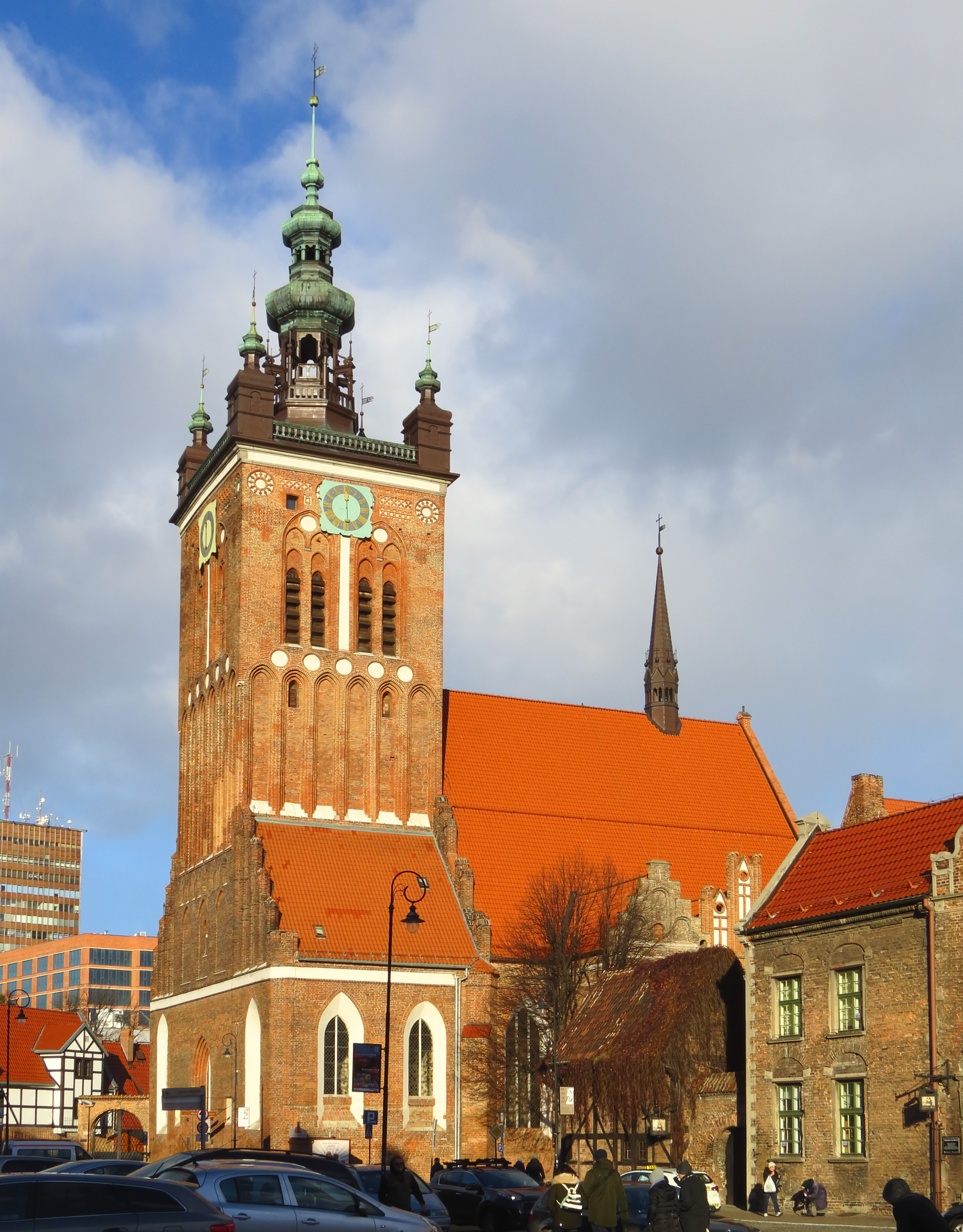
- Side view, 2018
- St. Catherine's Church
- 54°21′15″N 18°39′05″E
- Location: Gdańsk
- Country: Poland
- Denomination: Roman Catholic
- Previous denomination: Lutheran
- Website: www.gdansk.karmelici.pl

History
- Status: Church
- Founded: XIIIc.
- Dedication: St. Catherine of Alexandria

Architecture
- Functional status: Active
- Style: brick gothic
- Completed: 1227–1239

Specifications
- Length: 61.5 m
- Materials: Brick

Administration
- Archdiocese: Roman Catholic Archdiocese of Gdańsk

Historic Monument of Poland
- Designated: 1994-09-08
- Part of: Gdańsk – city within the 17th-century fortifications
- Reference no.: M.P. 1994 nr 50 poz. 415

St Catherine's Church (Polish: Kościół św. Katarzyny, German: Katharinenkirche) is the oldest church in Gdańsk, Poland. Though building began in the 1220s, it experienced many renovations and additions to reach its full size. The Gothic-style design includes chappels, a high gable roof, a square floor plan, vaults, and more.

It was a Protestant church from 1545 until the end of World War II in 1945, after which it returned to the Catholic Church.

The 14th-century building includes Hevelius' tomb, due to his dedication to his role as church administrator. It was once the parish church of the Old Town.

It houses the world's first pulsar clock (since 2011), the Museum of Turret Clocks (part of the Museum of Gdańsk) and previously (2000-2006) an art gallery (in its attic). The 76 meter tower, topped with Baroque spires, houses a 50-bell carillon. The carillon chimes on the hour, every hour, since the 50th anniversary of the outbreak of World War II.

In 2006 it suffered a major fire, resulting in the collapse of the roof.

== Gallery ==
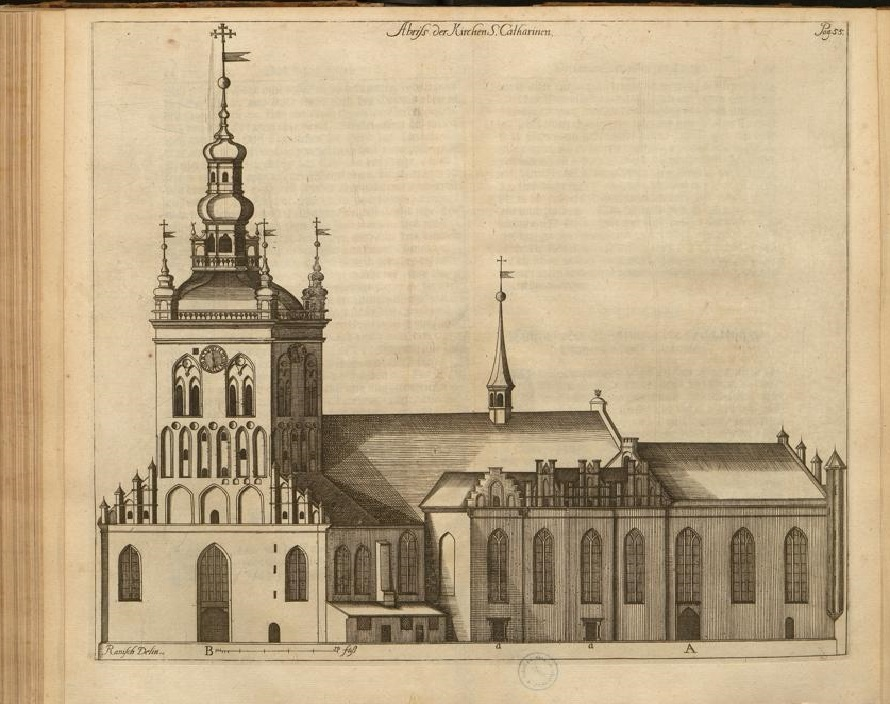
The church in 1695

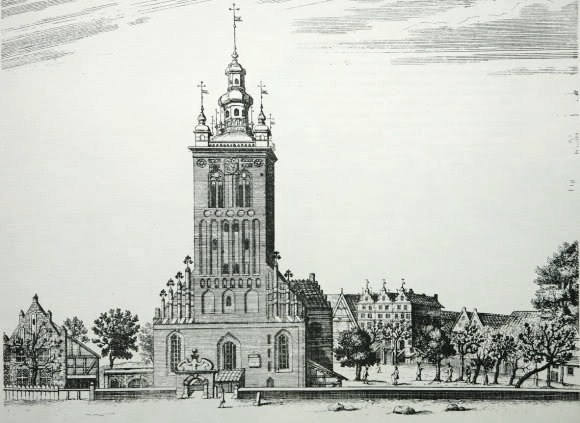
The church in the 1770s

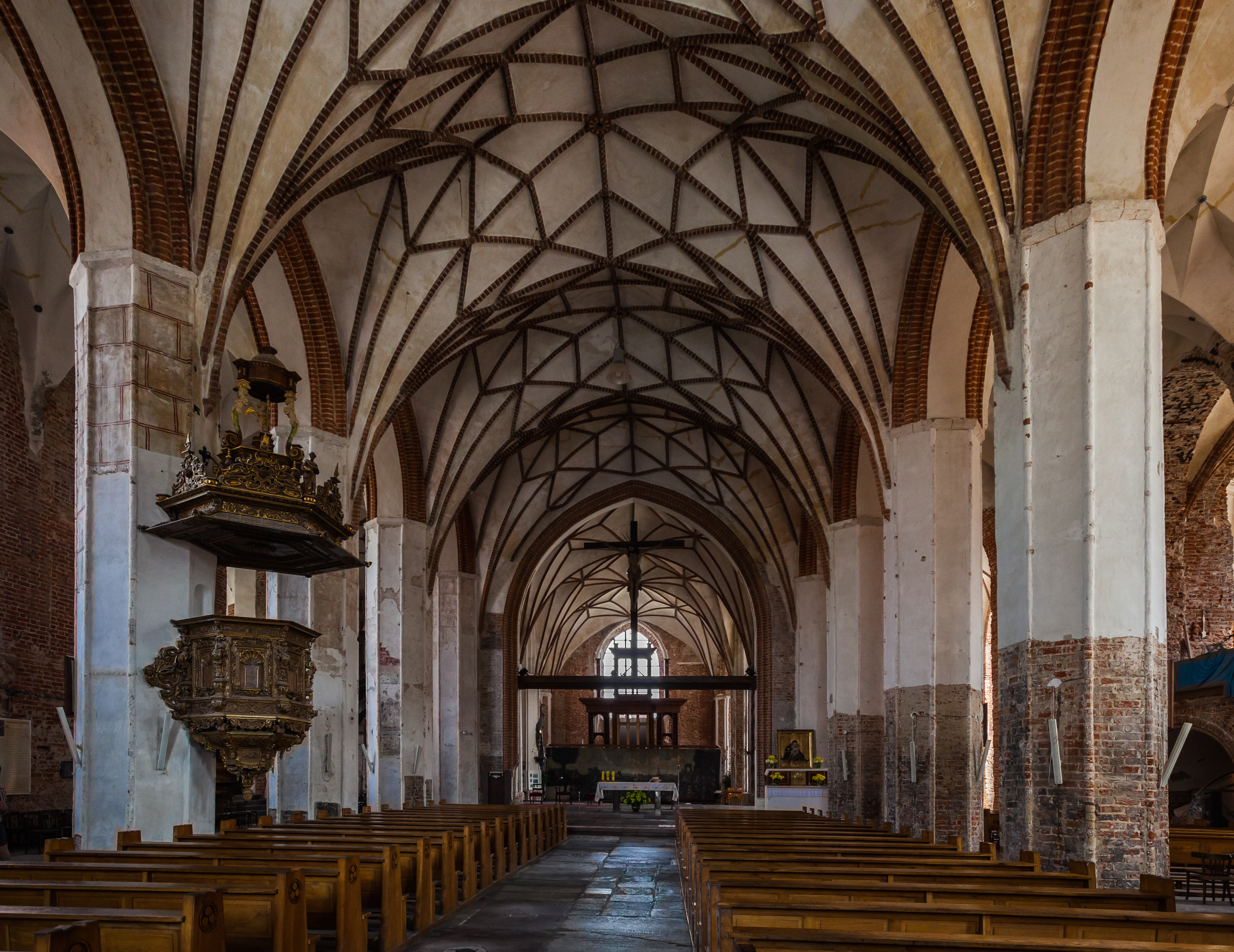
Interior

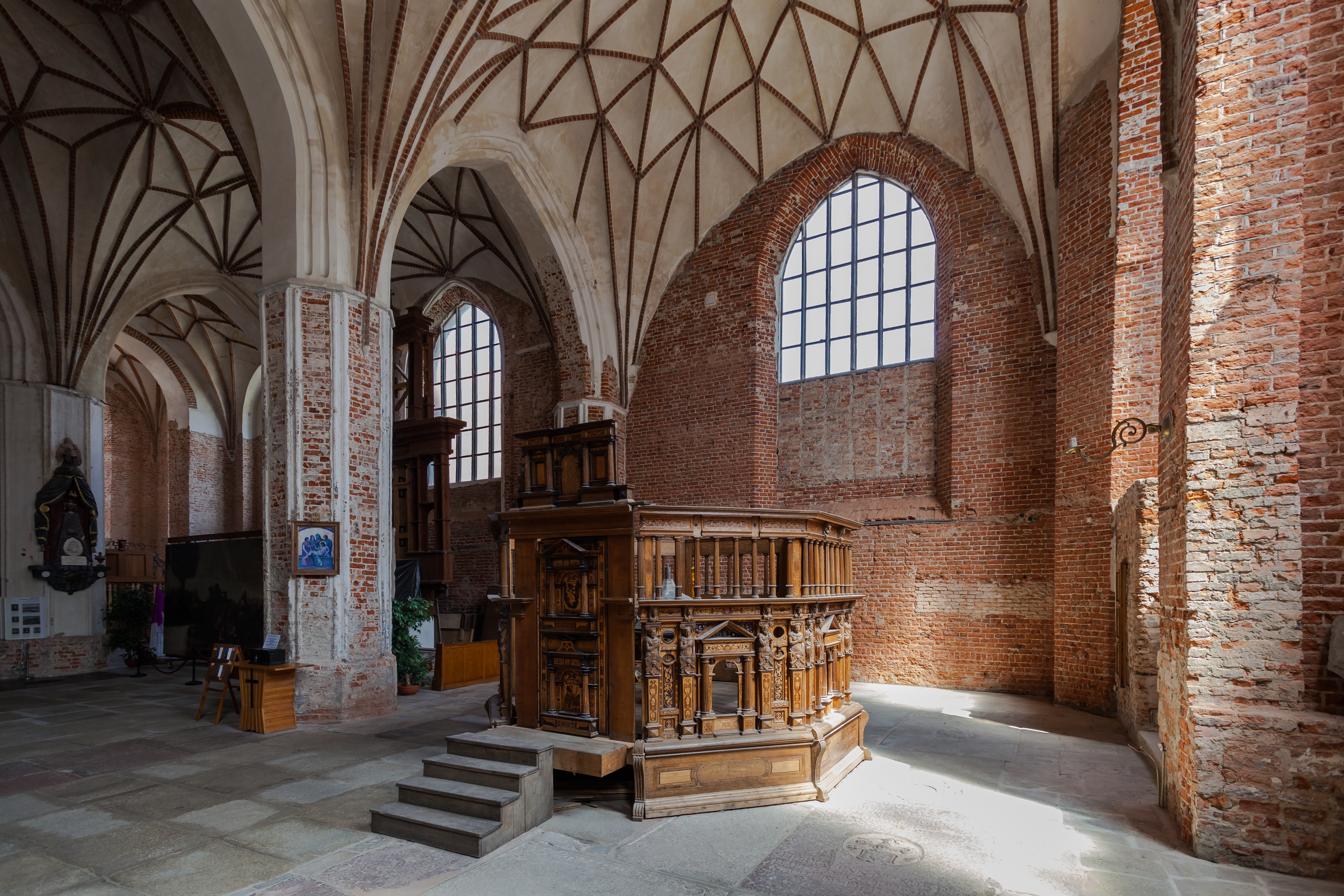

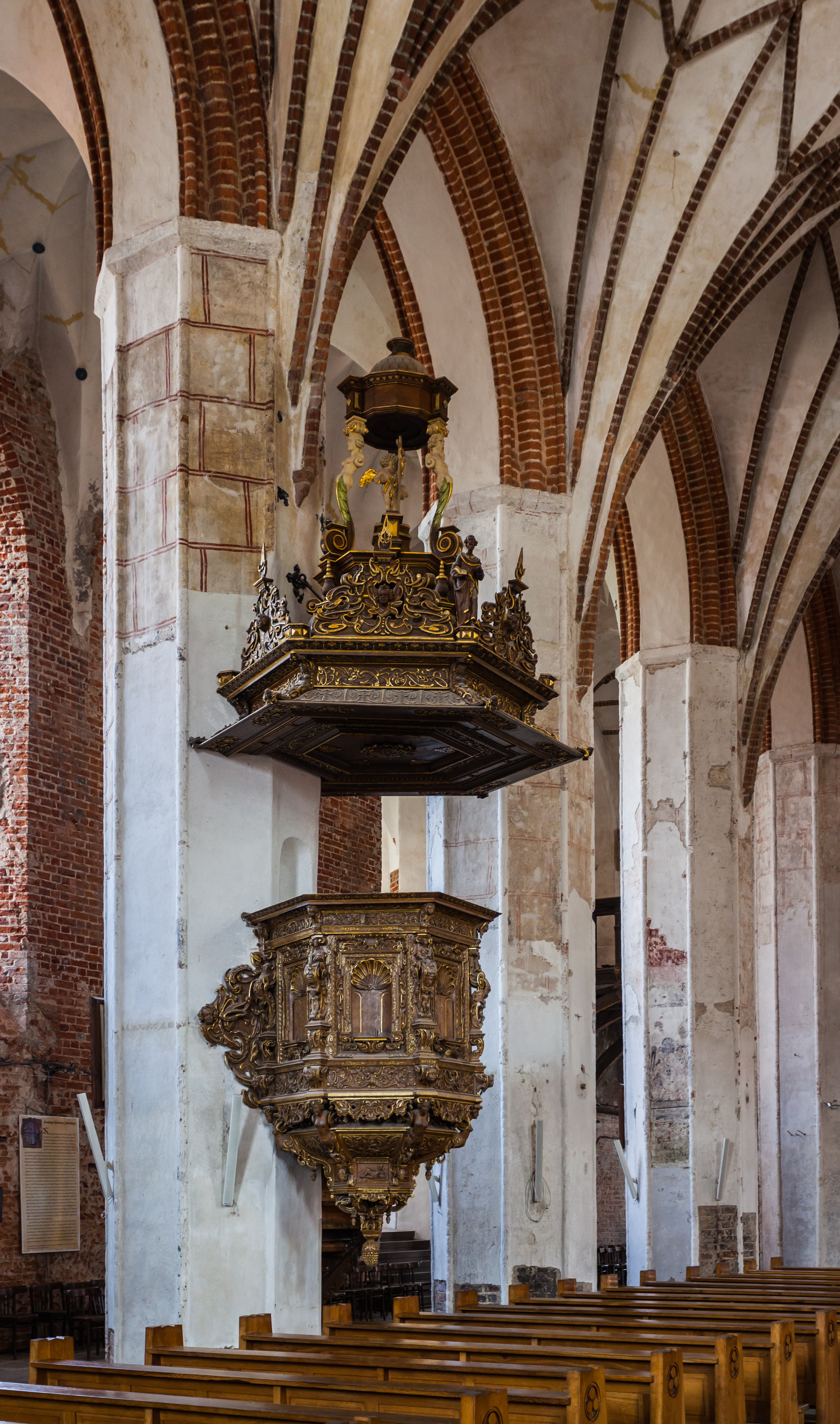

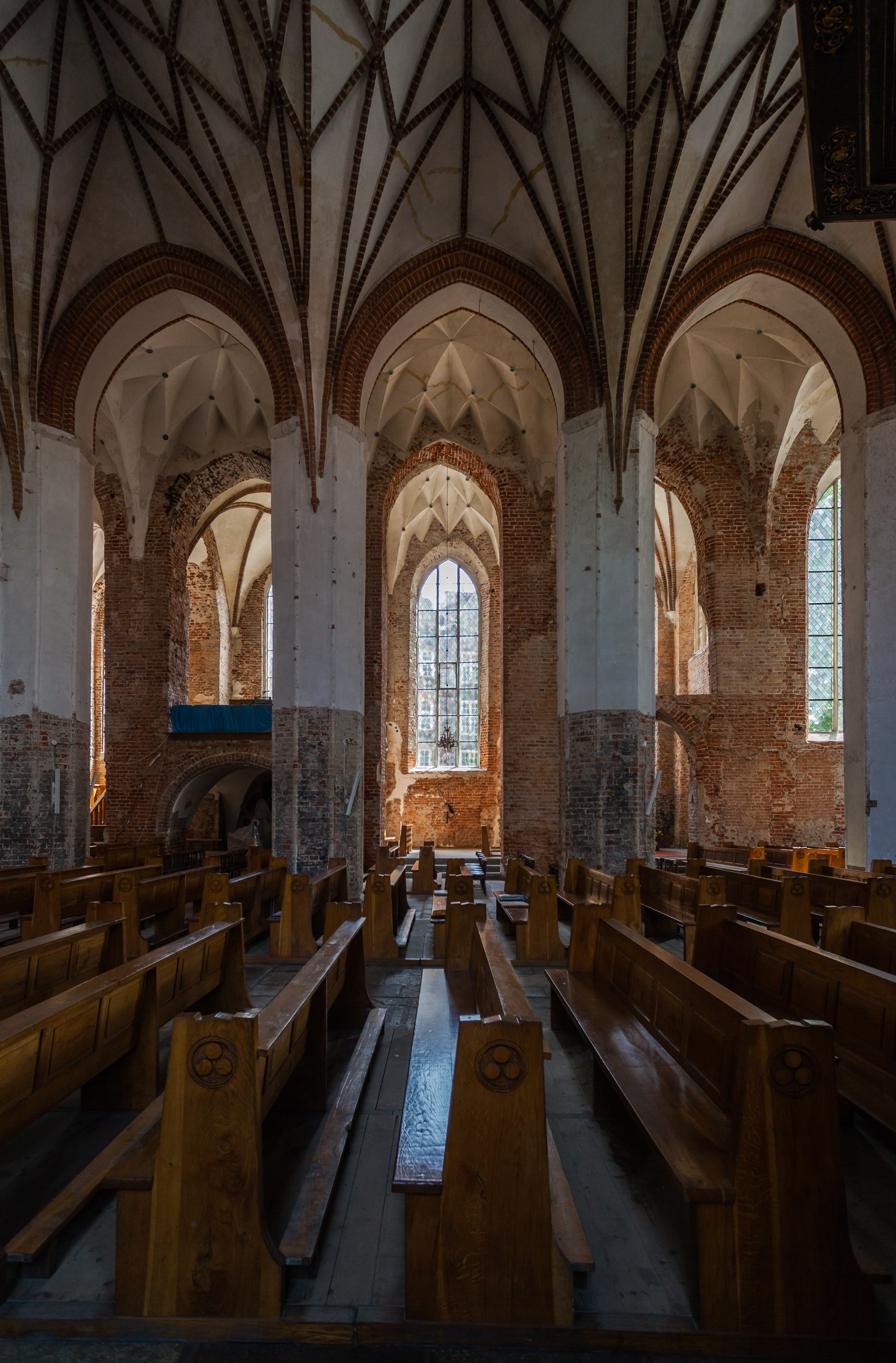

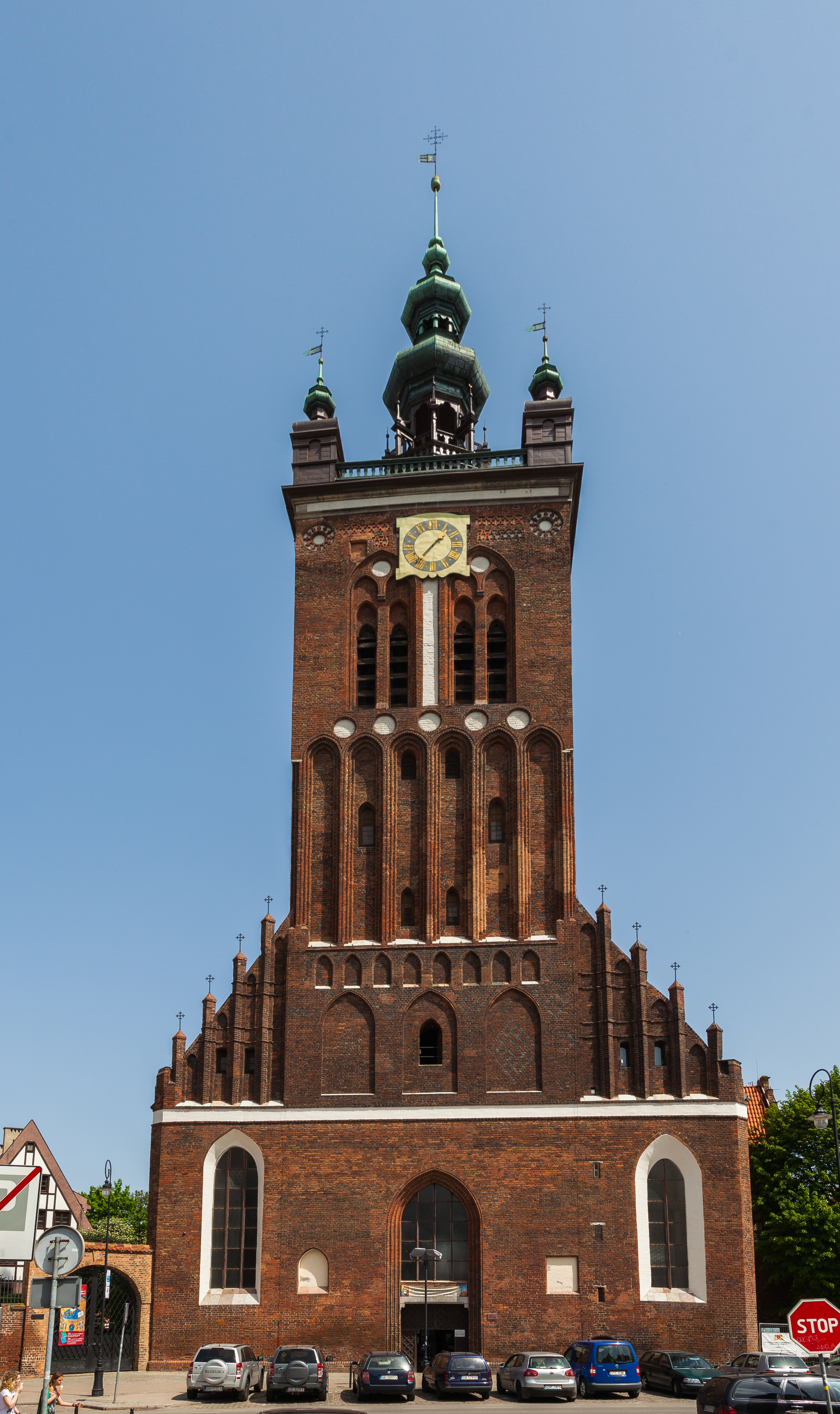
