= PSR J1841−0500 =

Pulsar in the constellation Scutum

Observation data Epoch J2000.0 Equinox ICRS
- Constellation: Scutum
- Right ascension: 18^{h} 41^{m} 18.14^{s}
- Declination: −05° 00′ 19.5″

Characteristics
- Spectral type: Pulsar

Astrometry
| Distance | 22,800 ly (6,990 pc) |

Details
| Rotation | 0.91291580208 s |
| Age | 416,000 years |

Other designations
- PSR J1841−0500

Database references
| SIMBAD | data |

PSR J1841−0500 is a pulsar located 22,800 light-years from the Sun in the Scutum–Centaurus Arm of the Milky Way. It was discovered in December 2008 by Fernando Camilo, who was using the Parkes Observatory when he discovered the object. At the time of discovery, it was spinning once every 0.9129 seconds. However, in 2009, it stopped emitting pulses completely.

Most pulsars that stop emitting pulses only do so for a few minutes. But PSR J1841-0500 did so for 580 days. Then in August 2011, it started pulsing again. In comparison, only one other pulsar is known to stop pulsing for more than a few minutes: PSR B1931+24 turns on for a week and then stops emitting pulses for a month in a cycle.
