= Glitch (astronomy) =

Sudden increase in the rotational frequency of a pulsar

In astronomy, a glitch is a sudden small increase of around 1 part in 1 million in the rotational frequency of a pulsar, which usually decreases steadily due to braking provided by the emission of radiation and high-energy particles. It is not known whether glitches are related to the timing noise which all pulsars exhibit. Following a glitch is a period of gradual recovery where the observed periodicity slows to a period close to that observed before the glitch. These gradual recovery periods have been observed to last from days to years. As of 2024 only multiple glitches of the Crab and Vela pulsars have been observed and studied extensively.

== Cause ==
While the exact cause of glitches is unknown, they are thought to be caused by an internal process within the pulsar. This differs from the steady decrease in the pulsar's rotational frequency, which is caused by external processes. Although the details of the glitch process are unknown, it is thought that the resulting increase in the pulsar's rotational frequency is caused by a brief coupling of the pulsar's faster-spinning superfluid core to the crust, to which it is usually not coupled. This brief coupling transfers angular momentum from core to surface, which causes a decrease in the measured period.

== Implications ==
If the mechanism is as suggested above, observed pulsar glitches set a limit on the moment of inertia of the pulsar being observed and, thus, the mass-radius relation possible in dense nuclear matter. More generally, observations of pulsar glitches allow indirect information on the dense nuclear matter in neutron star interiors to be inferred, in particular its superfluid properties.

== See also ==
- Anti-glitch
