= Vela Pulsar =

Multi-spectrum pulsar in the constellation Vela

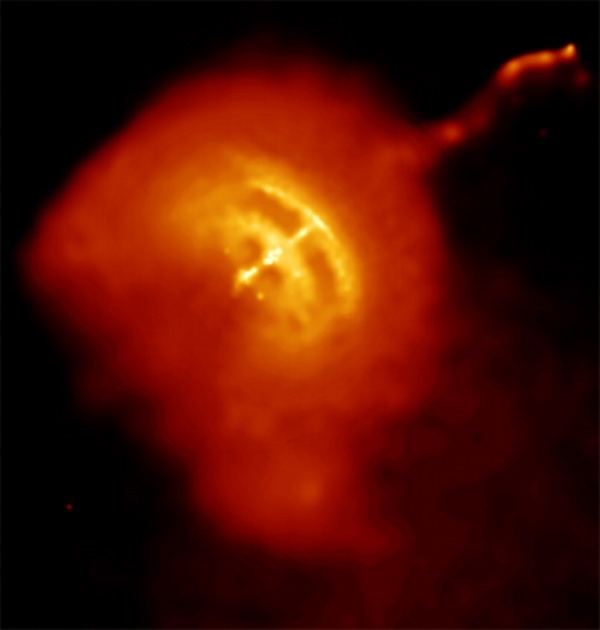
- The Vela Pulsar and its surrounding pulsar wind nebula

Observation data Epoch J2000 Equinox ICRS
- Constellation: Vela
- Right ascension: 08^{h} 35^{m} 20.65525^{s}
- Declination: −45° 10′ 35.1545″
- Apparent magnitude (V): 23.6

Astrometry
Distance	959+248 −163 ly (294+76 −50 pc)
Absolute magnitude (M_{V})	16.3

Details
Rotation	89.328385024 ms

Other designations
- HU Vel, PSR J0835–4510, PSR B0833–45, 4U 0833–45, 2CG 263–02, 2E 0833.6–4500, 3EG J0834–4511, H 0833–450, INTEGRAL1 5, SNR G263.6–02.8

Database references
SIMBAD	data

The Vela Pulsar (PSR J0835–4510 or PSR B0833–45) is a radio, optical, X-ray- and gamma-emitting pulsar associated with the Vela supernova remnant in the constellation of Vela. Its parent Type II supernova exploded approximately 11,000–12,300 years ago (and was about 800 light-years away).

== Characteristics ==
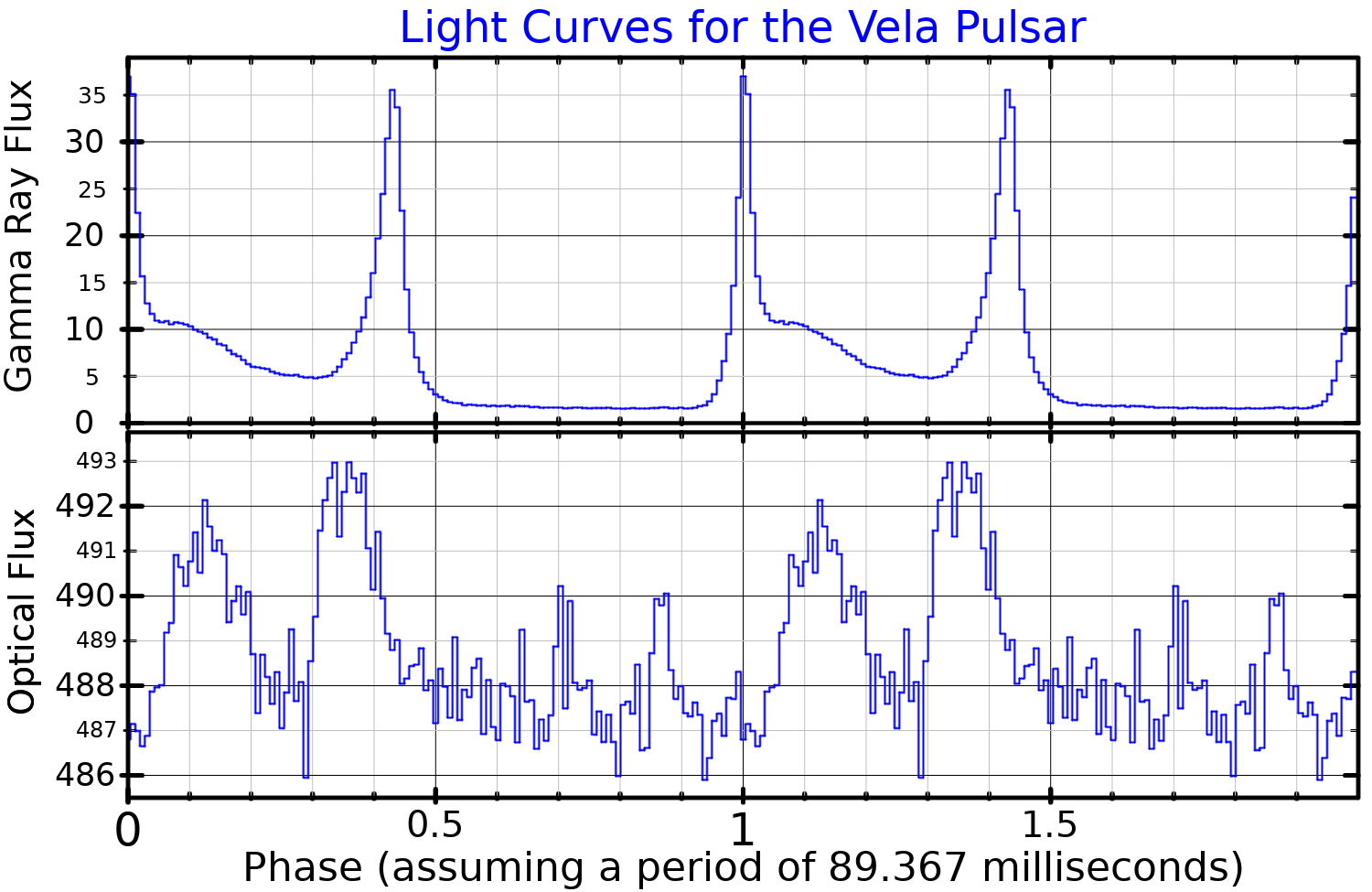
Gamma ray and optical (visible light) light curves for the pulsar, adapted from Spolon et al. (2019)

Vela is the brightest pulsar (at radio frequencies) in the sky and spins 11.194 times per second (i.e. a period of 89.328 milliseconds—the shortest known at the time of its discovery) and the remnant from the supernova explosion is estimated to be travelling outwards at 1,200 km/s (750 mi/s). It has the third-brightest optical component of all known pulsars (V = 23.6 mag) which pulses twice for every single radio pulse. The Vela pulsar is the brightest persistent object in the high-energy gamma-ray sky.

Pulsed emission up to 20 TeV has been detected from the Vela Pulsar and together with the Crab Pulsar at 1.5 TeV these are the only two known pulsars with emission in this energy range.

== Glitches ==
Glitches are sudden spin-ups in the rotation of pulsars. Vela is the best known of all the glitching pulsars, with glitches occurring on average every three years. Glitches are currently not predictable.

On 12 December 2016, Vela was observed to glitch live for the first time with a radio telescope (the 26 m telescope at the Mount Pleasant Radio Observatory) large enough to see individual pulses. This observation showed that the pulsar nulled (i.e. did not pulse) for one pulse, with the pulse prior being very broad and the two following pulses featuring low linear polarization. It also appeared that the glitch process took under five seconds to occur and this allowed the estimation of the physical properties of the pulsar.

On 22 July 2021, a new glitch occurred. As a result, the period of the pulsar decreased by about 1 part in a million.

Statistically, nearly 1% of the long-term spin-down of the pulsar is reversed in spin-up glitches, a fraction that is also observed in other monitored pulsars. Careful estimation of the glitch activity and its uncertainty requires statistical tools beyond the simple linear regression.

== Research campaigns ==
The association of the Vela pulsar with the Vela Supernova Remnant, made by astronomers at the University of Sydney in 1968, was direct observational proof that supernovae form neutron stars.

Studies conducted by Kellogg et al. with the Uhuru spacecraft in 1970–71 showed the Vela pulsar and Vela X to be separate but spatially related objects. The term Vela X was used to describe the entirety of the supernova remnant. Weiler and Panagia established in 1980 that Vela X was actually a pulsar wind nebula, contained within the fainter supernova remnant and driven by energy released by the pulsar.

== Nomenclature ==
The pulsar is occasionally referred to as Vela X, but this phenomenon is separate from either the pulsar or the Vela X nebula. A radio survey of the Vela-Puppis region was made with the Mills Cross Telescope in 1956–57 and identified three strong radio sources: Vela X, Vela Y, and Vela Z. These sources are observationally close to the Puppis A supernova remnant, which is also a strong X-ray and radio source.

Neither the pulsar nor either of the associated nebulae should be confused with Vela X-1, an observationally close but unrelated high-mass X-ray binary system.

== In music ==
The emissions of Vela and the pulsar PSR B0329+54 were converted into audible sound by French composer Gérard Grisey and used in the piece Le noir de l'étoile (1989–90).

== Gallery ==
Cycle of pulsed gamma rays from the Vela Pulsar

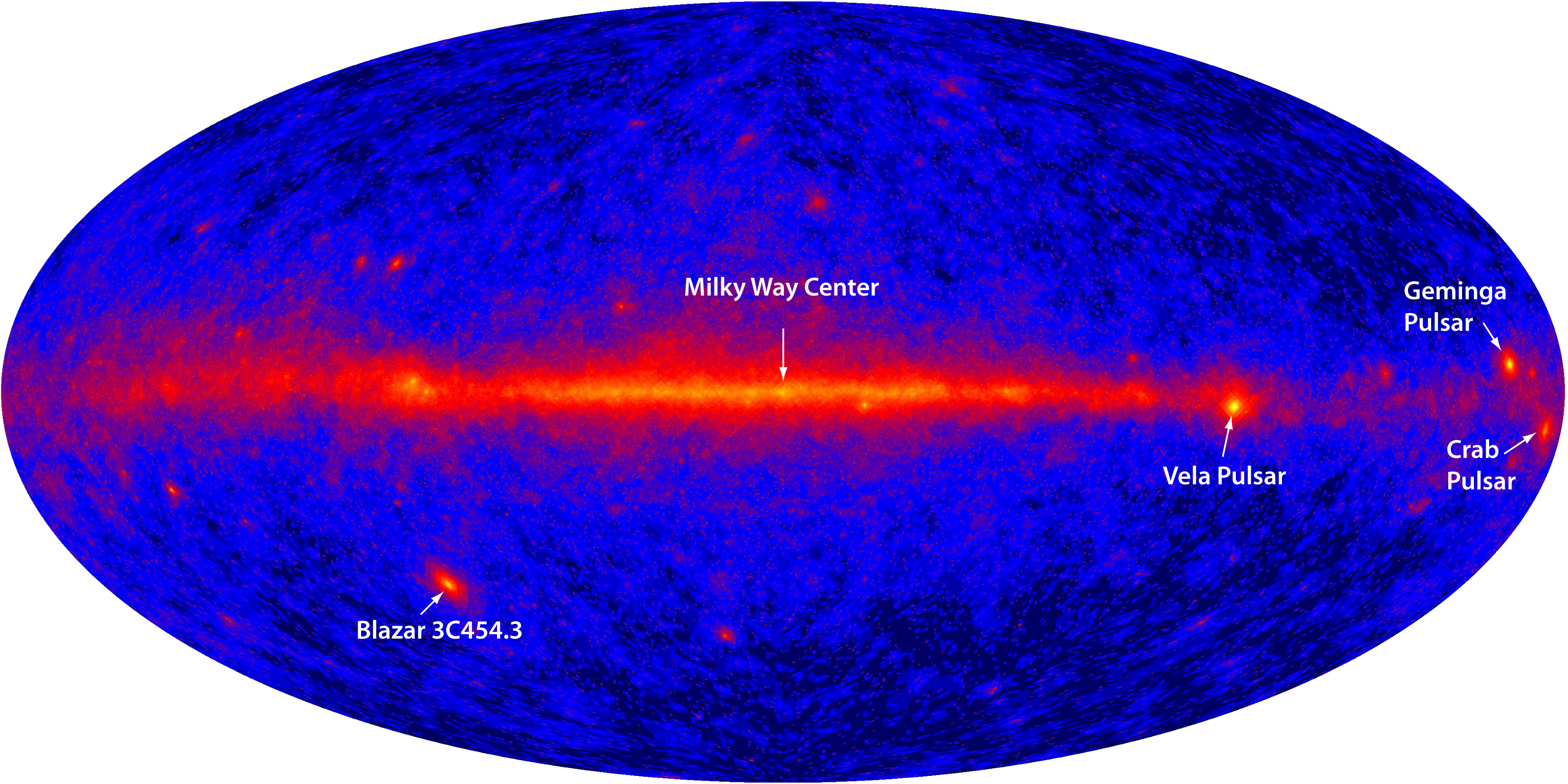
Position of the Vela Pulsar in the Milky Way

Video consisting of eight images of Vela's particle jet, looped continuously
