= PSR J0108−1431 =

Pulsar in the constellation Cetus

Observation data Epoch J2000 Equinox ICRS
- Constellation: Cetus
- Right ascension: 01^{h} 08^{m} 08.29^{s}
- Declination: −14° 31′ 48.5″
- Apparent magnitude (V): ≥ 27.8

Astrometry
Proper motion (μ)	RA: 92 ± 44 mas/yr Dec.: −176 ± 70 mas/yr
Distance	424 ly (130 pc)

Details
Temperature	88,000 K
Rotation	0.807564614019 s
Age	166 Myr

Database references
SIMBAD	data

PSR J0108−1431 is a solitary neutron star manifesting as a pulsar located at a distance of about 130 parsecs (424 light-years) in the constellation Cetus. It was discovered in 1994 during the Parkes Southern Pulsar Survey. This object is young as a neutron star (with an estimated age of 166 million years) but old as a pulsar, with a slow spin period of 0.8075 seconds. The rotational energy being generated by the spin-down of this pulsar is 5.8 × 10^{23} W and the surface magnetic field is 2.5 × 10^{7} T. As of 2008, it was the second-faintest pulsar seen from Earth.

An X-ray emission with an energy flux of (9 ± 2) × 10^{−18} W m^{−2} was detected in the 0.3−8 keV band using the Chandra X-ray Observatory. This X-ray energy is generated from the conversion of 0.4% of the pulsar's spin-down power. As of 2009, PSR J0108−1431 is the least powerful of the ordinary pulsars that have been detected in the X-ray range.

The "Very Large Telescope" at the European Southern Observatory in Northern Chile observed a possible optical counterpart of this neutron star. The object has an apparent magnitude that is (X ≤ 27.8). No companions have been discovered in orbit around this object.
