= Crab Pulsar =

Pulsar in the constellation Taurus

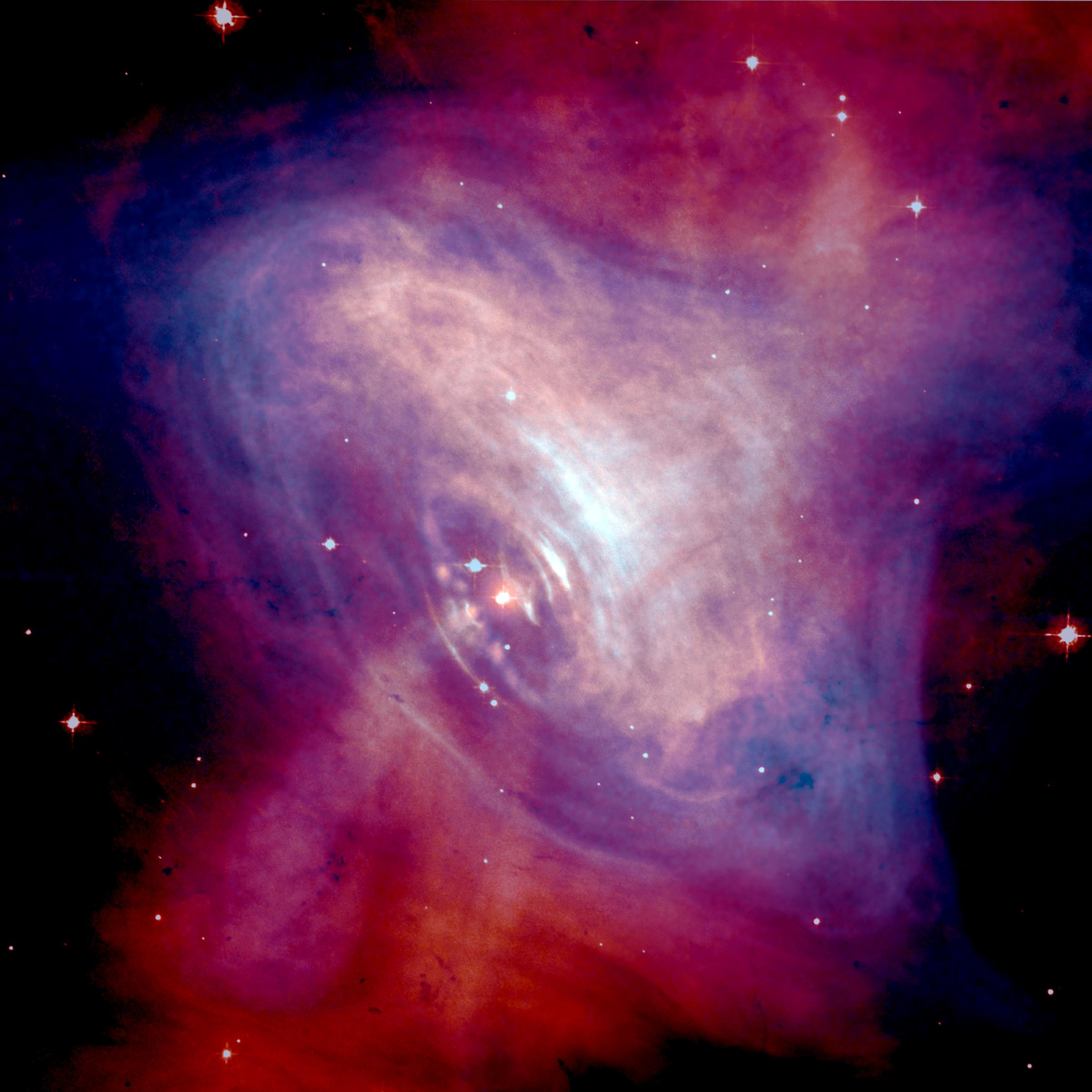
- The Crab Nebula, which contains the Crab Pulsar (the red star in the center). Image combines optical data from Hubble (in red) and X-ray images from Chandra (in blue). Credit: NASA/CXC/ASU/J. Hester et al

Observation data Epoch J2000 Equinox ICRS
- Constellation: Taurus
- Right ascension: 05^{h} 34^{m} 31.95^{s}
- Declination: +22° 00′ 52.2″
- Apparent magnitude (V): 16.65

Characteristics
- Evolutionary stage: Neutron star

Astrometry
| Proper motion (μ) | RA: −11.34±0.06 mas/yr Dec.: 2.65±0.14 mas/yr |
| Parallax (π) | 0.53±0.06 mas |
| Distance | approx. 6,200 ly (approx. 1,900 pc) |
| Absolute magnitude (M_{V}) | 5.26 |

Details
| Mass | 1.5–2.5 M_{☉} |
| Radius | ~10 km |
| Temperature | center (modeled): ~3×10^{8} K, surface: ~1.6×10^{6} K |
| Rotation | 33.3924123 ms |

Other designations
- SNR G184.6–05.8, 2C 481, 3C 144.0, SN 1054A, 4C 21.19, NGC 1952, PKS 0531+219, PSR B0531+21, PSR J0534+2200, CM Tau

Database references
| SIMBAD | data |

The Crab Pulsar (PSR B0531+21 or Baade's Star) is a relatively young neutron star. The star is the central star in the Crab Nebula, a remnant of the supernova SN 1054, which was widely observed on Earth in the year 1054. Discovered in 1968, the pulsar was the first to be connected with a supernova remnant.

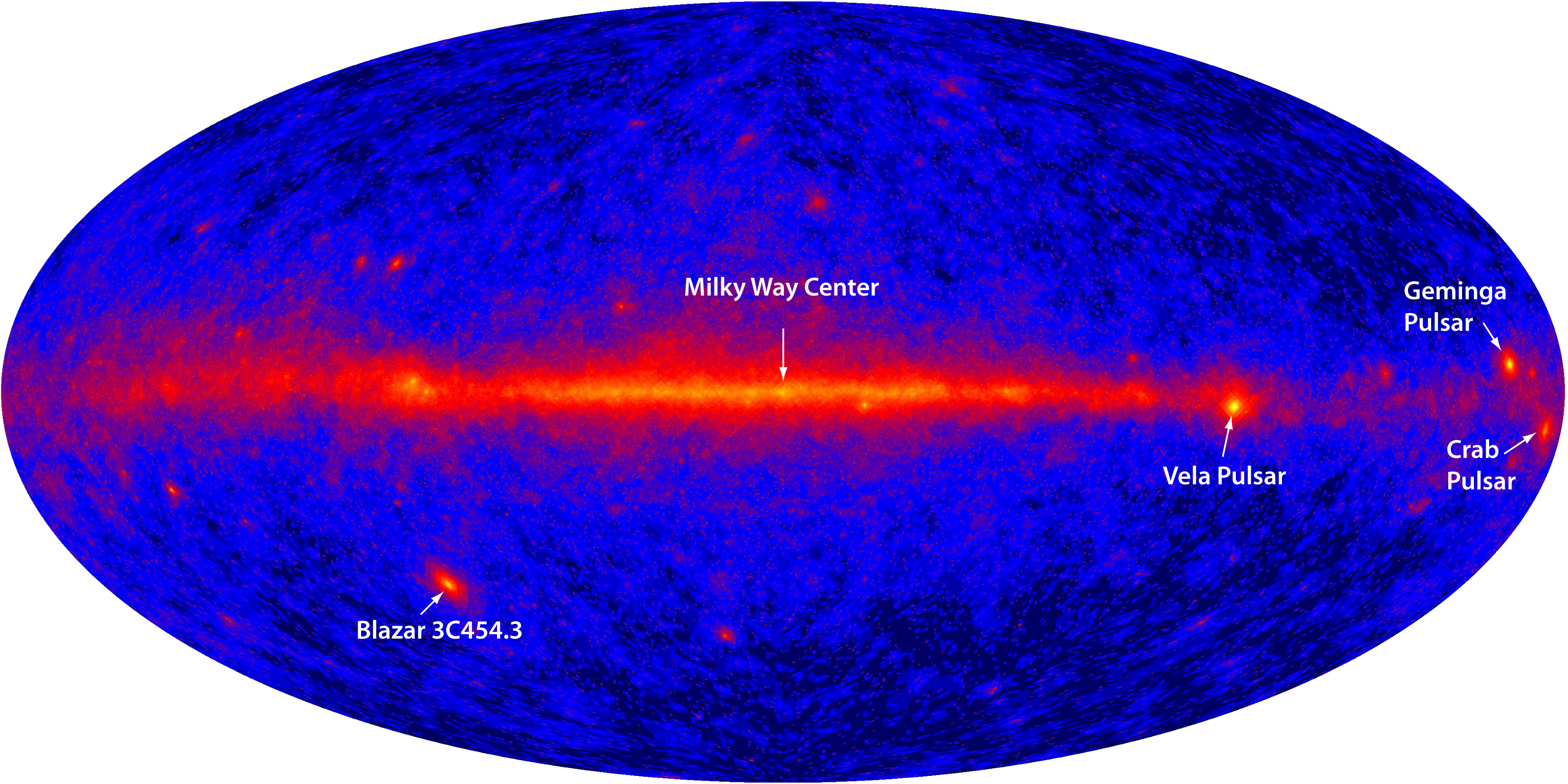
The sky seen in gamma-rays as seen by the Fermi Gamma-ray Space Telescope, reveals the Crab Pulsar as one of the brightest gamma-ray sources in the sky.

The Crab Pulsar is one of very few pulsars to be identified optically. It was initially discovered as a radio pulsar. The optical pulsar is roughly 20 kilometres (12 mi) in diameter and has a rotational period of 33.392 milliseconds, that is, the pulsar "beams" perform 29.946 revolutions per second. The outflowing relativistic wind from the neutron star generates synchrotron emission, which produces the bulk of the emission from the nebula, seen from radio waves through to gamma rays. The most dynamic feature in the inner part of the nebula is the point where the pulsar's equatorial wind slams into the surrounding nebula, forming a termination shock. The shape and position of this feature shifts rapidly, with the equatorial wind appearing as a series of wisp-like features that steepen, brighten, then fade as they move away from the pulsar into the main body of the nebula. The period of the pulsar's rotation is increasing by 38 nanoseconds per day due to the large amounts of energy carried away in the pulsar wind.

The Crab Nebula is often used as a calibration source in X-ray astronomy. It is very bright in X-rays, and the flux density and spectrum are constant, with the exception of the pulsar itself. The pulsar provides a strong periodic signal that is used to check the timing of the X-ray detectors. In X-ray astronomy, "crab" and "millicrab" are sometimes used as units of flux density. A millicrab corresponds to a flux density of about 2.4×10^{−11} erg s^{−1} cm^{−2} (2.4×10^{−14} W/m^{2}) in the 2–10 keV X-ray band, for a "crab-like" X-ray spectrum, which is roughly power-law in photon energy: I ~ E^{−1.1}. Very few X-ray sources ever exceed one crab in brightness.

Pulsed emission up to 1.5 TeV has been detected from the Crab Pulsar. The only other known pulsar with emission in this energy range is the Vela Pulsar at 20 TeV.

== History of observation ==
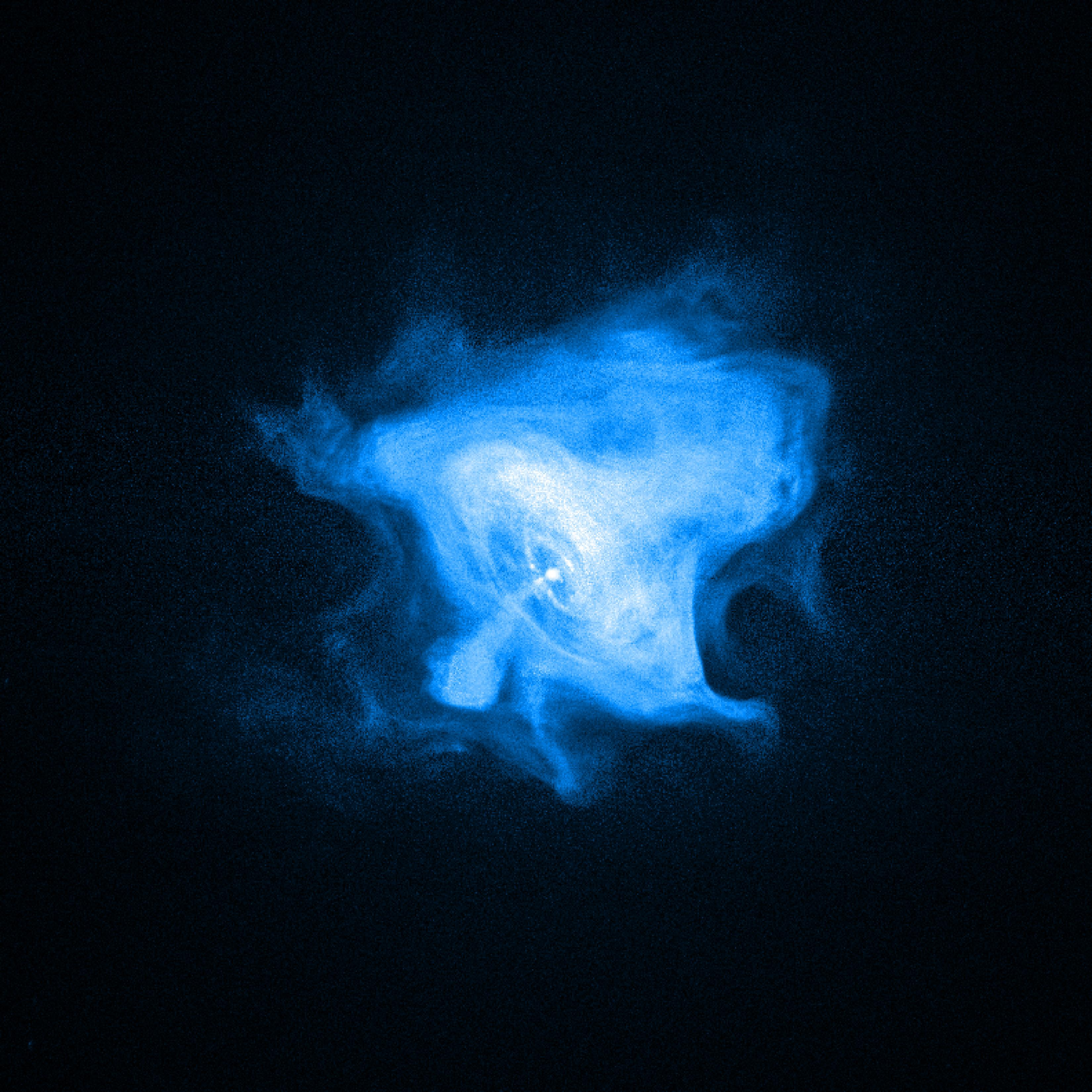
X-ray picture of Crab Nebula, taken by Chandra

The Crab Nebula was identified as the remnant of SN 1054 by 1939. Astronomers then searched for the nebula's central star. There were two candidates, referred to in the literature as the "north following" and "south preceding" stars. In September 1942, Walter Baade ruled out the "north following" star but found the evidence inconclusive for the "south preceding" star. Rudolf Minkowski, in the same issue of The Astrophysical Journal as Baade, advanced spectral arguments claiming that the "evidence admits, but does not prove, the conclusion that the south preceding star is the central star of the nebula".

In late 1968, David H. Staelin and Edward C. Reifenstein III reported the discovery of two rapidly varying radio sources "near the crab nebula that could be coincident with it" using the 300-foot (91 m) Green Bank radio antenna. They were given the designations NP 0527 and NP 0532. The period of 33 milliseconds and location of the Crab Nebula pulsar NP 0532 was discovered by Richard V. E. Lovelace and collaborators on 10 November 1968, at the Arecibo Radio Observatory. The discovery of the pulsar with such a short period proved that pulsars are rotating neutron stars (not pulsating white dwarfs, as many scientists suggested). Soon after the discovery of the Crab Pulsar, David Richards discovered (using the Arecibo Telescope) that it spins down and, therefore, loses its rotational energy. Thomas Gold has shown that the pulsar's spin-down power is sufficient to power the Crab Nebula.

A subsequent study by them, including William D. Brundage, also found that the NP 0532 source is located at the Crab Nebula. A radio source was also reported coincident with the Crab Nebula in late 1968 by L. I. Matveenko in Soviet Astronomy.

Optical pulsations were first reported by Cocke, Disney and Taylor using the 36-inch (91 cm) telescope on Kitt Peak of the Steward Observatory of the University of Arizona. This observation had an audio tape recording the pulses and this tape also recorded the voices of John Cocke, Michael Disney and Bob McCallister (the night assistant) at the time of the discovery. Their discovery was confirmed by Nather, Warner and Macfarlane.

Jocelyn Bell Burnell, who co-discovered the first pulsar PSR B1919+21 in 1967, under the supervision of Antony Hewish, relates that in the late 1950s a woman viewed the Crab Nebula source at the University of Chicago's telescope, then open to the public, and noted that it appeared to be flashing. The astronomer she spoke to, Elliot Moore, disregarded the effect as scintillation, despite the woman's protestation that as a qualified pilot she understood scintillation and this was something else. Bell Burnell notes that the 30 Hz frequency of the Crab Nebula optical pulsar is difficult for many people to see.

In 2007, it was reported that Charles Schisler detected a celestial source of radio emission in 1967 at the location of the Crab Nebula, using a United States Air Force radar system in Alaska designed as an early warning system to detect intercontinental ballistic missiles. This source was later understood by Schisler to be the Crab Pulsar, after the news of Bell Burnell's initial pulsar discoveries was reported. However, Schisler's detection was not reported publicly for four decades due to the classified nature of the radar observations.

The Crab Pulsar was the first pulsar for which the spin-down limit was broken using several months of data of the LIGO observatory. Most pulsars do not rotate at constant rotation frequency, but can be observed to slow down at a very slow rate (3.7×10^{−10} Hz/s in case of the Crab). This spin-down can be explained as a loss of rotation energy due to various mechanisms. The spin-down limit is a theoretical upper limit of the amplitude of gravitational waves that a pulsar can emit, assuming that all the losses in energy are converted to gravitational waves. That no gravitational waves are observed at the expected amplitude and frequency (after correcting for the expected Doppler shift) proves that other mechanisms must be responsible for the loss in energy. The non-observation so far is not completely unexpected, since physical models of the rotational symmetry of pulsars put a more realistic upper limit on the amplitude of gravitational waves several orders of magnitude below the spin-down limit. It is hoped that with improvement of the sensitivity of gravitational wave instruments and the use of longer stretches of data, gravitational waves emitted by pulsars will be observed in future. The only other pulsar for which the spin-down limit was broken so far is the Vela Pulsar.

In 2019 the Crab Nebula, and presumably therefore the Crab Pulsar, was observed to emit gamma rays in excess of 100 TeV, making it the first identified source of ultra-high-energy cosmic rays.

In 2023, very-long-baseline interferometry (VLBI) was used to conduct precision astrometry using the radio giant-pulse emission of the Crab Pulsar, thus measuring a precise distance to the Crab Pulsar.

Light curve and slow-motion picture of the pulsar located in the center of the Crab Nebula. Image taken with a photon counting camera on the 80cm telescope of the Wendelstein Observatory, Dr. F. Fleischmann, 1998

A slow-motion animation of the Crab Pulsar taken at 800 nm wavelength (near-infrared) using a Lucky Imaging camera from Cambridge University, showing the bright pulse and fainter interpulse
