= Symmetry energy =

In nuclear physics, the symmetry energy reflects the variation of the binding energy of the nucleons in the nuclear matter depending on its neutron to proton ratio as a function of baryon density. Symmetry energy is an important parameter in the equation of state describing the nuclear structure of heavy nuclei and neutron stars.

== Definition ==
Let $n_p$ and $n_n$ be the number density of protons and neutrons in nuclear matter, and $n = n_p + n_n$. Let $E_0(n)$ be the binding energy per nucleon in symmetric matter, with equally many protons as neutrons, as a function of density. The binding energy per nucleon $E$ of non-symmetric matter is then a function that also depends on the isospin asymmetry,

$$\delta = \frac{n_p - n_n}{n}$$

so to lowest order the energy per baryon is

$$E(n, \delta) = E_0(n) + S(n) \delta^2 + O(\delta^4),$$

where $S$ is the symmetry energy. There are no odd powers of $\delta$ in the expansion because the nuclear force acts the same between two protons as between two neutrons. At saturation density $n_0$, the symmetry energy is 32.0±1.1 MeV.
