= PSR J1903+0327 =

Millisecond pulsar in the constellation Aquila

Observation data Epoch J2000 Equinox J2000
- Constellation: Aquila
- Right ascension: 19^{h} 03^{m} 05.79321^{s}
- Declination: +03° 27′ 19.2091″

Characteristics
- Spectral type: Pulsar

Orbit
Primary	PSR J1903+0327
Name	Sun-like star
Period (P)	95.174118753 days
Eccentricity (e)	0.436678409

Details

PSR J1903+0327
Mass	1.67 M_{☉}
Rotation	2.14991236434921 ms
Age	1.81 Gyr

Sun-like star
Mass	~1 M_{☉}

Other designations
- PSR J1903+0327

Database references
SIMBAD	data

PSR J1903+0327 is a millisecond pulsar in a highly eccentric binary orbit.

The pulsar was discovered in an ongoing L-band (1.4 GHz) survey with the 305 m diameter Arecibo radio telescope.

The pulse period is 2.1499 milliseconds, or 465.13 times per second. Analysis of the pulse timing residuals shows a binary orbit with a period of 95.174 days, and a high eccentricity, e = 0.4366. The mass of the companion is ~1 solar mass (M_{☉}), while the pulsar mass is unusually large at 1.67 ± 0.02 M_{☉}; the third largest precisely measured mass after those of PSR J1614−2230 and PSR J0348+0432. A companion, magnitude 18 in near-infrared light of 2.22 μm (the K_{S} band), was recorded by the Gemini North observatory. In 2011, radial velocity measurements made with the VLT confirmed this to be the companion to the millisecond pulsar, the first such system to be observed in the galaxy.

Popular theories for the formation of binary millisecond pulsars require mass transfer onto the rotating neutron star from a white dwarf companion in order to spin it up to periods less than about 10 milliseconds—a process expected to be accompanied by strong tidal forces, producing a highly circular orbit. The main-sequence companion and the eccentric orbit of PSR J1903+0327 do not conform to this expectation. The system is likely to have originated as a triple system. The remnant of the star that transferred mass to the neutron star (its original close companion) was later ejected by a gravitational interaction with the unevolved third member of the system; its present main-sequence companion.
