= Neutron star =

Collapsed core of a massive star

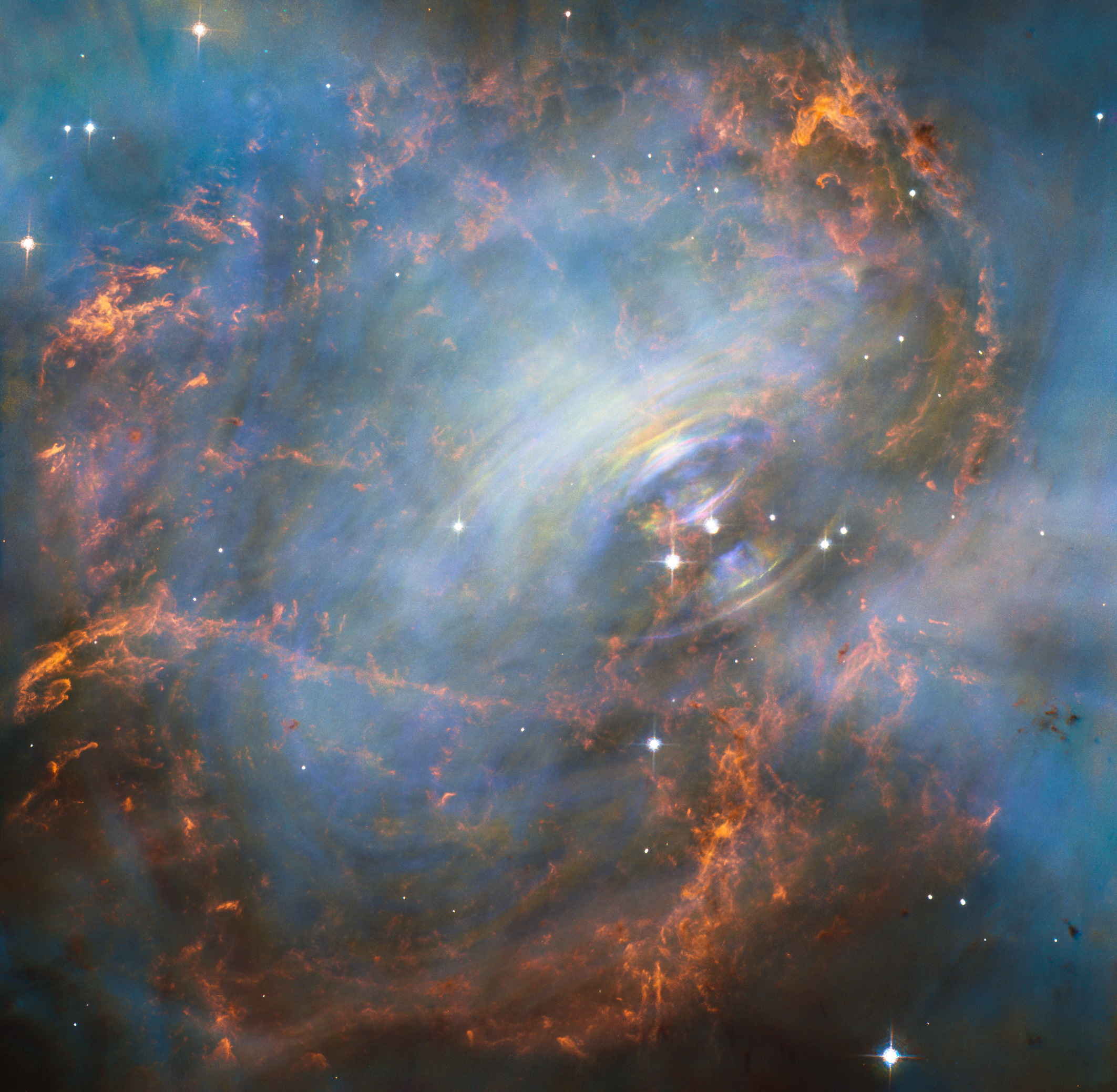
- Image of the Crab Nebula taken by the Hubble Space Telescope. The wind echo of the Crab Pulsar can be seen on the center-right of the image.

Characteristics
- Type: Class of stellar remnant
- Mass range: 1.44–2.2/2.9 M_{☉}
- Temperature: At least 42,000 K
- Average luminosity: Dependent on the age of the neutron star

External links
- Media category
- Q4202

A neutron star is the gravitationally collapsed core of a massive supergiant star. It results from the supernova explosion of a massive star—combined with gravitational collapse—that compresses the core past white dwarf star density to that of atomic nuclei. Neutron stars are the second-smallest and second-densest known class of stellar objects, surpassed only by black holes in both respects. Neutron stars have a radius on the order of 10 kilometers (6 miles) and a mass of about 1.4 solar masses (M_{☉}). Stars that collapse into neutron stars typically have an initial total mass between 10 and 25 M_{☉} or possibly more for those that are especially rich in elements heavier than hydrogen and helium.

There are thought to be around one billion neutron stars in the Milky Way, and at a minimum several hundred million, a figure obtained by estimating the number of stars that have undergone supernova explosions. However, many of them have existed for a long period of time and have cooled down considerably. Originally it was thought that neutron stars would be difficult to detect due to low thermal emissions. However, it was discovered that spinning stars emit radiation. Most neutron stars that have been detected are pulsars or a part of a binary system.

Neutron stars in a binary system with a main sequence star can pull in large amounts of gas from its companion, a process called accretion. These binary systems continue to evolve, with many companions eventually becoming compact objects such as white dwarfs or neutron stars themselves, though other possibilities include a complete destruction of the companion through ablation or collision.

The study of neutron star systems is central to gravitational wave astronomy. The merger of binary neutron stars produces gravitational waves and is associated with kilonovae and short gamma-ray bursts. In 2017, the LIGO and Virgo interferometer sites observed GW170817, the first direct detection of gravitational waves from such an event. Prior to this, indirect evidence for gravitational waves was inferred by studying the gravity radiated from the orbital decay of a different type of (unmerged) binary neutron system, the Hulse–Taylor pulsar.

== Formation ==
Simplified representation of the formation of neutron stars

Any main-sequence star with an initial mass of greater than 8 M_{☉} (eight times the mass of the Sun) has the potential to become a neutron star. As the star evolves away from the main sequence, stellar nucleosynthesis produces an iron-rich core. When all nuclear fuel in the core has been exhausted, the core must be supported by degeneracy pressure alone. Further deposits of mass from shell burning cause the core to exceed the Chandrasekhar limit. Electron-degeneracy pressure is overcome, and the core collapses further, causing temperatures to rise to over 5×10^{9} K. At these temperatures, photodisintegration (the breakdown of iron nuclei into alpha particles due to high-energy gamma rays) occurs. As the temperature of the core continues to rise, electrons and protons combine to form neutrons via electron capture, releasing a flood of neutrinos. When densities reach a nuclear density of 4×10^{17} kg/m^{3}, a combination of strong force repulsion and neutron degeneracy pressure halts the contraction. The contracting outer envelope of the star is halted and rapidly flung outwards by a flux of neutrinos produced in the creation of the neutrons, resulting in a supernova and leaving behind a neutron star. However, if the remnant has a mass greater than about 3 M_{☉}, it instead becomes a black hole. Observations of gravitational waves from neutron star merger GW170817, which is thought to have generated a black hole shortly afterward, have refined the mass limit estimate for a non-rotating neutron star to ~2.17 M_{☉}.

As the core of a massive star is compressed during a Type II supernova or a Type Ib or Type Ic supernova, and collapses into a neutron star, it retains most of its angular momentum. Because it has only a tiny fraction of its parent's radius (sharply reducing its moment of inertia), a neutron star is formed with very high rotation speed and then, over a very long period, it slows. Neutron stars are known that have rotation periods from about 1.4 ms to 30 s. The neutron star's density also gives it very high surface gravity, with typical values ranging from 10^{12} to 10^{13} m/s^{2} (more than 10^{11} times that of Earth). One measure of such immense gravity is the fact that neutron stars have an escape velocity of over half the speed of light. The neutron star's gravity accelerates infalling matter to tremendous speed, and tidal forces near the surface can cause spaghettification.

== Properties ==
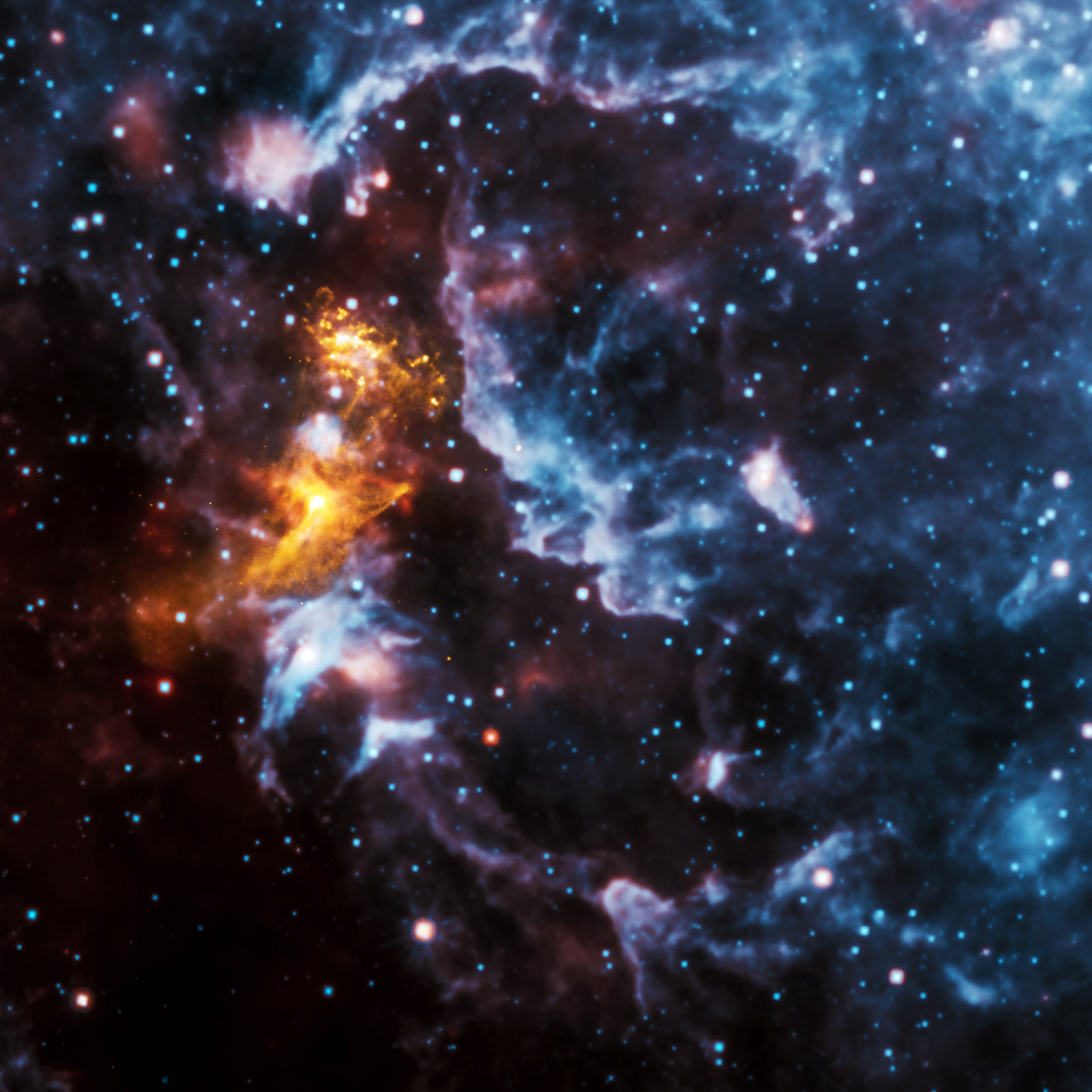
Radiation from the rapidly spinning pulsar PSR B1509−58 makes nearby gas emit X-rays (gold) and illuminates the rest of the nebula, here seen in infrared (blue and red).

Once formed, neutron stars no longer actively generate heat and cool over time, but they may still evolve further through collisions or accretion. Most of the basic models for these objects imply that they are composed almost entirely of neutrons, as the extreme pressure causes the electrons and protons present in normal matter to combine into additional neutrons. These stars are partially supported against further collapse by neutron degeneracy pressure, just as white dwarfs are supported against collapse by electron degeneracy pressure. However, this is not by itself sufficient to hold up an object beyond 0.7 M_{☉} and repulsive nuclear forces increasingly contribute to supporting more massive neutron stars. If the remnant star has a mass exceeding the Tolman–Oppenheimer–Volkoff limit, approximately 2.2 to 2.9 M_{☉}, the combination of degeneracy pressure and nuclear forces is insufficient to support the neutron star, causing it to collapse and form a black hole. The most massive neutron star detected so far, PSR J0952–0607, is estimated to be 2.35±0.17 M_{☉}.

Newly formed neutron stars may have surface temperatures of ten million kelvins or more. However, since neutron stars generate no new heat through fusion, they inexorably cool down after their formation. Still, surface temperatures will be around one million kelvins after one thousand to one million years, and older, even cooler neutron stars are still easy to discover. For example, the well-studied neutron star, RX J1856.5−3754, has an average surface temperature of about 434,000 K. By comparison, the effective surface temperature of the Sun is only 5,780 K.

Neutron star material is remarkably dense: a normal-sized matchbox containing neutron-star material would have a weight of approximately 3 billion tonnes, the same weight as a 0.5-cubic-kilometer chunk of the Earth (a cube with edges of about 800 meters) from Earth's surface.

As a star's core collapses, its rotation rate increases due to conservation of angular momentum, so newly formed neutron stars typically rotate at up to several hundred times per second. Some neutron stars emit beams of electromagnetic radiation that make them detectable as pulsars, and the discovery of pulsars by Jocelyn Bell Burnell and Antony Hewish in 1967 was the first observational suggestion that neutron stars exist. The fastest-spinning neutron star known is PSR J1748−2446ad, rotating at a rate of 716.35 times per second or 42,981 revolutions per minute, giving a linear (tangential) speed at the surface on the order of 0.24c (i.e., nearly a quarter the speed of light).

=== Equation of state ===
Equation of state relate thermodynamic quantities in equilibrium conditions. Models predicting the equation of state are based on experimental data from nuclei on Earth. At the extraordinarily high densities of neutron stars, ordinary matter is squeezed to nuclear densities. Specifically, the matter ranges from nuclei embedded in a sea of electrons at low densities in the outer crust, to increasingly neutron-rich structures in the inner crust, to the extremely neutron-rich uniform matter in the outer core, and possibly exotic states of matter at high densities in the inner core.

Understanding the nature of the matter present in the various layers of neutron stars, and the phase transitions that occur at the boundaries of the layers is a major unsolved problem in fundamental physics. A presumptive neutron star equation of state would encode information about the structure of a neutron star and would explain how matter behaves at the extreme densities found inside neutron stars. Constraints on the neutron star equation of state would then provide constraints on how the strong interaction of the Standard Model works, which would have profound implications for nuclear and atomic physics. This would make neutron stars natural laboratories for probing fundamental physics.

For example, the exotic states that may be found at the cores of neutron stars are types of QCD matter. At the extreme densities at the centers of neutron stars, neutrons become disrupted giving rise to a sea of quarks. This matter's equation of state is governed by the laws of quantum chromodynamics and since QCD matter cannot be produced in any laboratory on Earth, most of the current knowledge about it is only hypothetical.

Different equations of state lead to different values of observable quantities. While the equation of state relates directly only to density and pressure, these in turn lead to calculating observables like the speed of sound, mass, radius, and Love numbers. There are many proposed neutron star equations of state, such as FPS, UU, APR, L, and SLy, and it is an active area of research.

Another aspect of the equation of state is whether it is a soft or stiff equation of state. This relates to how much pressure there is at a certain energy density, and often corresponds to phase transitions. When the material is about to go through a phase transition, the pressure will tend to increase until it shifts into a more comfortable state of matter. A soft equation of state would have a gently rising pressure versus energy density while a stiff one would have a sharper rise in pressure. In neutron stars, nuclear physicists are still testing whether the equation of state should be stiff or soft, and sometimes it changes within individual equations of state depending on the phase transitions within the model. This is referred to as the equation of state stiffening or softening, depending on the previous behavior. Since it is unknown what neutron stars are made of, there is room for different phases of matter to be explored within the equation of state.

=== Density and pressure ===
Comparison of a 10-km-radius neutron star (top left corner) and a 6,000-km-radius white dwarf, the latter roughly the size of Earth

Neutron stars have overall densities of 3.7×10^{17} to 5.9×10^{17} kg/m^{3} (2.6×10^{14} to 4.1×10^{14} times the density of the Sun), (Note: 3.7×10^{17} kg/m^{3} derives from mass 2.68×10^{30} kg / volume of star of radius 12 km; 5.9×10^{17} kg/m^{3} derives from mass 4.2×10^{30} kg per volume of star radius 11.9 km) which is comparable to the approximate density of an atomic nucleus of 3×10^{17} kg/m^{3}. The density increases with depth, varying from about 1×10^{9} kg/m^{3} at the crust to an estimated 6×10^{17} or 8×10^{17} kg/m^{3} deeper inside. Pressure increases accordingly, from about 3.2×10^{31} Pa (32 QPa) at the inner crust to 1.6×10^{34} Pa in the center.

A neutron star is so dense that one teaspoon (4.929 milliliters) of its material would have a mass over 5.5×10^{12} kg, about 900 times the mass of the Great Pyramid of Giza. (Note: The average density of material in a neutron star of radius 10 km is 1.1×10^{12} kg/cm^{3}. Therefore, 5 ml of such material has a mass of 5.5×10^{12} kg, or 5.5 billion metric tons. This is about 15 times the total mass of the human world population. Alternatively, 5 ml from a neutron star of radius 20 km (average density 8.35×10^{10} kg/cm^{3}) has a mass of about 400 million metric tons, or about the mass of all humans. The gravitational field is ca. 2×10^{11} g or ca. 2×10^{12} N/kg. Moon weight is calculated at 1 g.) The entire mass of the Earth at neutron star density would fit into a sphere 305 m in diameter, about the size of the Arecibo Telescope.

In popular scientific writing, neutron stars are sometimes described as macroscopic atomic nuclei. Indeed, both states are composed of nucleons, and they share a similar density to within an order of magnitude. However, in other respects, neutron stars and atomic nuclei are quite different. A nucleus is held together by the strong interaction, whereas a neutron star is held together by gravity. The density of a nucleus is uniform, while neutron stars are predicted to consist of multiple layers with varying compositions and densities.

=== Current constraints ===
Because equations of state for neutron stars lead to different observables, such as different mass–radius relations, there are many astronomical constraints on equations of state. These come mostly from the LIGO gravitational wave observatory and the NICER X-ray telescope.

NICER's observations of pulsars in binary systems, from which the pulsar mass and radius can be estimated, can constrain the neutron star equation of state. A 2021 measurement of the pulsar PSR J0740+6620 was able to constrain the radius of a 2.0 M_{☉} neutron star to 12.39+1.3
−0.98 km with 95% confidence. Additional data on other pulsars extended the constraints to include 1.4 M_{☉} at 12.33+0.76
−0.81 km. These mass–radius constraints, combined with chiral effective field theory calculations, tighten constraints on the neutron star equation of state.

Equation of state constraints from LIGO gravitational wave detections start with nuclear and atomic physics researchers, who work to propose theoretical equations of state (such as FPS, UU, APR, L, SLy, and others). The proposed equations of state can then be passed onto astrophysics researchers who run simulations of binary neutron star mergers. From these simulations, researchers can extract gravitational waveforms, thus studying the relationship between the equation of state and gravitational waves emitted by binary neutron star mergers. Using these relations, one can constrain the neutron star equation of state when gravitational waves from binary neutron star mergers are observed. Numerical relativity simulations of binary neutron star mergers have found relationships between the equation of state and frequency dependent peaks of the gravitational wave signal that must conform with LIGO detections. For example, the LIGO detection of the binary neutron star merger GW170817 provided limits on the tidal deformability of neutron star binaries, ruling out whole families equations of state. Future gravitational wave signals with next generation detectors like Cosmic Explorer can impose further constraints.

When nuclear physicists are trying to understand the likelihood of their equation of state, it is good to compare with these constraints to see if it predicts neutron stars of these masses and radii. There is also recent work on constraining the equation of state with the speed of sound through hydrodynamics.

=== Tolman–Oppenheimer–Volkoff equation ===
The Tolman–Oppenheimer–Volkoff (TOV) equation can be used to describe a neutron star. The equation is a solution to Einstein's equations from general relativity for a spherically symmetric, time-invariant metric. With a given equation of state, solving the equation leads to observables such as the mass and radius. There are many codes that numerically solve the TOV equation for a given equation of state to find the mass–radius relation and other observables for that equation of state.

The following differential equations can be solved numerically to find the neutron star observables:
$$\begin{align}
\frac{dp}{dr} &= -\frac{G\epsilon(r) M(r)}{c^2 r^2} \left(1 + \frac{p(r)}{\epsilon(r)}\right) \left(1 + \frac{4\pi r^3p(r)}{M(r)c^2}\right) \left(1 - \frac{2GM(r)}{c^2r}\right)^{-1}, \\
\frac{dM}{dr} &= \frac{4\pi}{c^2} r^2 \epsilon(r),
\end{align}$$
where G is the gravitational constant, p(r) is the pressure, ϵ(r) is the energy density (found from the equation of state), and c is the speed of light.

=== Mass–radius relation ===
Neutron star mass–radius relationships for several scenarios. Black dots indicate highest-mass stars, and colored bars represent constraints by observed pulsars.

Using the TOV equations and an equation of state, a mass–radius curve can be found. In theory, for a correct equation of state, every neutron star that could possibly exist would lie along that curve. To create these curves, the TOV equations must be solved for different central densities. For each central density, the mass and pressure equations must be numerically solved until the pressure goes to zero, which represents the outside of the star. Each solution gives a corresponding mass and radius for that central density.

Mass–radius curves for different equations of state all reach a maximum value at specific radii. This maximum point is known as the maximum mass. Beyond that mass, the star will no longer be stable, i.e. no longer be able to hold itself up against gravity and would collapse into a black hole. Since each equation of state leads to a different mass–radius curve, each equation also leads to a unique maximum mass value. For example, Oppenheimer and Volkoff came up with the Tolman–Oppenheimer–Volkoff limit of ~0.7 M_{☉} using a non-interacting degenerate neutron gas equation of state. More advanced theories include interactions between the neutrons which increases the pressure of the gas and thus increases the mass limit above 2.0 M_{☉}. If in addition the star is rotating rapidly, this limit can be as high as 2.9 M_{☉}. Observations of the neutron star PSR J0952–0607 suggest that it has a mass of 2.35±0.17 M_{☉}.

One phenomenon in this area of astrophysics relating to the maximum mass of neutron stars is known as the "mass gap". The mass gap refers to a range of masses from roughly two to five solar masses where very few compact objects were observed. This range is based on the current assumed maximum mass of neutron stars (~2 M_{☉}) and the minimum black-hole mass (~5 M_{☉}). Recently, some objects have been discovered that fall in that mass gap from gravitational wave detections. If the true maximum mass of neutron stars was known, it would help characterize compact objects in that mass range as either neutron stars or black holes.

=== I-Love-Q relations ===
There are three more properties of neutron stars that are dependent on the equation of state but can also be astronomically observed: the moment of inertia, the quadrupole moment, and the Love number. The moment of inertia of a neutron star describes how fast the star can rotate at a fixed spin momentum. The quadrupole moment of a neutron star specifies how much that star is deformed out of its spherical shape. The Love number of the neutron star represents how easy or difficult it is to deform the star due to tidal forces, typically important in binary systems.

While these properties depend on the material of the star and therefore on the equation of state, there is a relation between these three quantities that is independent of the equation of state. This relation assumes slowly and uniformly rotating stars and uses general relativity to derive the relation. While this relation would not be able to add constraints to the equation of state, since it is independent of the equation of state, it does have other applications. If one of these three quantities can be measured for a particular neutron star, this relation can be used to find the other two. In addition, this relation can be used to break the degeneracies in detections by gravitational wave detectors of the quadrupole moment and spin, allowing the average spin to be determined within a certain confidence level.

=== Temperature ===
The temperature inside a newly formed neutron star is around 10^{11} to 10^{12} K. A young neutron star mainly loses energy by neutrinos emission from their core and by photon emission from their surface atmospheres. The temperature of an isolated neutron star falls to around 10^{6} K within a few years. After reaching this lower temperature, most of the remaining radiation emitted by the slowly cooling star will be X-rays.

According to theoretical models, the cooling of a neutron star occurs in three stages:

1. the initial 10-100 years is initial thermal relaxation, where the surface temperature reflect only the star's crust which remains decoupled from its core,
2. neutrino stage where the emission of neutrinos dominates photons, lasting less than 10,000 years,
3. the last photon stage dominated by photon emission.

Rotation and the magnetic field may also affect the cooling rates of a neutron star by changing how heat is transported and how energy escapes from the star. Rotation plays a role in the cooling process. A cooling wave, which comes from the center of the star, will reach the equator after it reaches the poles and rapid rotation can delay the time period of crust relaxation up to hundreds of years. Moreover, as the rotation of the neutron star slows down, the decrease in centrifugal pressure may result in an increase in the density at the center of the star. If the central density exceeds the density required for direct Urca process, the cooling of the inner core will be initiated. A strong magnetic field may affect the thermal conductivity of the crust and produce an anisotropic surface temperature distribution, affecting the luminosity and thus the cooling of the neutron star.

=== Magnetic field ===
The magnetic field strength on the surface of neutron stars ranges from about 10^{4} to 10^{11} teslas (T). These are orders of magnitude higher than in any other object: for comparison, a continuous 16 T field has been achieved in the laboratory and is sufficient to levitate a living frog due to diamagnetic levitation. Variations in magnetic field strengths are most likely the main factor that allows different types of neutron stars to be distinguished by their spectra, and explains the periodicity of pulsars.

The subclass of neutron stars known as magnetars have the strongest magnetic fields, in the range of 10^{8} to 10^{11} T, and it has become widely accepted that these magnetars are the source of soft gamma repeaters (SGRs) and anomalous X-ray pulsars (AXPs). The magnetic energy density of a 10^{8} T field is extreme, greatly exceeding the mass-energy density of ordinary matter. (Note: Magnetic energy density for a field B is U = 1/2μ_{0}B^{2}. Substituting B = 10^{8} T, get U = 4×10^{21} J/m^{3}. Dividing by c^{2} one obtains the equivalent mass density of 44,500 kg/m^{3}, which exceeds the standard temperature and pressure density of all known materials. Compare with 22,590 kg/m^{3} for osmium, the densest stable element.) Fields of this strength are able to polarize the vacuum to the point that the vacuum becomes birefringent: photons can merge or split in two, and virtual particle–antiparticle pairs are produced. The field changes electron energy levels and atoms are forced into thin cylinders. Unlike in an ordinary pulsar, magnetar spin-down can be directly powered by its magnetic field, and the magnetic field is strong enough to stress the crust to the point of fracture. Fractures of the crust cause starquakes, observed as extremely luminous millisecond hard gamma ray bursts. The fireball is trapped by the magnetic field, and comes in and out of view when the star rotates, which is observed as a periodic soft gamma repeater (SGR) emission with a period of 5–8 seconds and which lasts for a few minutes.

The origins of the strong magnetic field are as yet unclear. One hypothesis is that of "flux freezing", or conservation of the original magnetic flux during the formation of the neutron star. If an object has a certain magnetic flux over its surface area, and that area shrinks to a smaller area, but the magnetic flux is conserved, then the magnetic field would correspondingly increase. Likewise, a collapsing star begins with a much larger surface area than the resulting neutron star, and conservation of magnetic flux would result in a far stronger magnetic field. However, this simple explanation does not fully explain magnetic field strengths of neutron stars.

=== Gravity ===
Gravitational light deflection at a neutron star. Due to relativistic light deflection, over half the surface is visible (each grid patch represents 30° by 30°). This star's radius is twice its Schwarzschild radius.

The gravitational field at a neutron star's surface is about 2×10^{11} times stronger than on Earth, at around 2.0×10^{12} m/s^{2}. Such a strong gravitational field acts as a gravitational lens and bends the radiation emitted by the neutron star such that parts of the normally invisible rear surface become visible. If the radius of the neutron star is 3GM/c^{2} or less, then the photons may be trapped in an orbit, thus making the whole surface of that neutron star visible from a single vantage point, along with destabilizing photon orbits at or below the 1 radius distance of the star.

A fraction of the mass of a star that collapses to form a neutron star is released in the supernova explosion from which it forms (from the law of mass–energy equivalence, E = mc^{2}). The energy comes from the gravitational binding energy of a neutron star.

Hence, the gravitational field of a typical neutron star is huge. If an object were to fall from a height of 1 m on a neutron star 12 km in radius, it would reach the ground at around 1,400 km/s. However, even before impact, the tidal force would cause spaghettification, breaking any sort of an ordinary object into a stream of material.

Because of the enormous gravity, time dilation between a neutron star and Earth is significant. For example, eight years could pass on the surface of a neutron star, yet ten years would have passed on Earth, not including the time-dilation effect of the star's very rapid rotation.

Neutron star relativistic equations of state describe the relation of radius vs. mass for various models. The most likely radii for a given neutron star mass are bracketed by models AP4 (smallest radius) and MS2 (largest radius). E_{B} is the gravitational binding energy of the observed neutron star of mass of M with radius R,
$$\frac{E_\text{B}}{Mc^2} = \frac{0.60\,\beta}{1 - \beta/2},$$
where
$$\beta = GM/Rc^2.$$

A neutron star of mass 2M_{☉} would not be more compact than 10970 m radius (AP4 model). Its mass fraction gravitational binding energy E_{B}/Mc^{2} would then be 0.187, −18.7% (exothermic). This is not near 0.6/2 = 0.3, −30%.

== Structure ==
Cross-section of neutron star. Densities are in terms of ρ_{0} the saturation nuclear matter density, where nucleons begin to touch.

Current understanding of the structure of neutron stars is defined by existing mathematical models, but it might be possible to infer some details through studies of neutron-star oscillations. Asteroseismology, a study applied to ordinary stars, can reveal the inner structure of neutron stars by analyzing observed spectra of stellar oscillations.

Current models indicate that matter at the surface of a neutron star is composed of ordinary atomic nuclei crushed into a solid lattice with a sea of electrons flowing through the gaps between them. It is possible that the nuclei at the surface are iron, due to iron's high binding energy per nucleon. It is also possible that heavy elements, such as iron, simply sink beneath the surface, leaving only light nuclei like helium and hydrogen. If the surface temperature exceeds 10^{6} K (as in the case of a young pulsar), the surface should be fluid instead of the solid phase that might exist in cooler neutron stars (temperature < 10^{6} K).

The outermost layers of a neutron star consist of an atmosphere several millimeters to centimeters in height, transitioning smoothly into an "ocean" of Coulomb-liquid with a "depth" between meters to tens of meters. Their dynamics are controlled by the neutron star's rotation period and magnetic field. Beneath the ocean is a solid crust. This crust is extremely hard and very smooth (with maximum surface irregularities on the order of millimeters or less), due to the extreme gravitational field.

Proceeding inward, one encounters nuclei with ever-increasing numbers of neutrons; such nuclei would decay quickly on Earth, but are kept stable by tremendous pressures. As this process continues at increasing depths, the neutron drip becomes overwhelming, and the concentration of free neutrons increases rapidly.

After a supernova explosion of a supergiant star, neutron stars are born from the remnants. A neutron star is composed mostly of neutrons (neutral particles) and contains a small fraction of protons (positively charged particles) and electrons (negatively charged particles), as well as nuclei. In the extreme density of a neutron star, many neutrons are free neutrons, meaning they are not bound in atomic nuclei and move freely within the star's dense matter, especially in the densest regions of the star—the inner crust and core. Over the star's lifetime, as its density increases, the energy of the electrons also increases, which generates more neutrons.

In neutron stars, the neutron drip is the transition point where nuclei become so neutron-rich that they can no longer hold additional neutrons, leading to a sea of free neutrons being formed. The sea of neutrons formed after neutron drip provides additional pressure support, which helps maintain the star's structural integrity and prevents gravitational collapse. The neutron drip takes place within the inner crust of the neutron star and starts when the density becomes so high that nuclei can no longer hold additional neutrons.

At the beginning of the neutron drip, the pressure in the star from neutrons, electrons, and the total pressure is roughly equal. As the density of the neutron star increases, the nuclei break down, and the neutron pressure of the star becomes dominant. When the density reaches a point where nuclei touch and subsequently merge, they form a fluid of neutrons with a sprinkle of electrons and protons. This transition marks the neutron drip, where the dominant pressure in the neutron star shifts from degenerate electrons to neutrons.

At very high densities, the neutron pressure becomes the primary pressure holding up the star, with neutrons being non-relativistic (moving at a small fraction of the speed of light) and extremely compressed. However, at extremely high densities, neutrons begin to move at relativistic speeds (close to the speed of light). These high speeds significantly increase the star's overall pressure, altering the star's equilibrium state, and potentially leading to the formation of exotic states of matter.

In that region, there are nuclei, free electrons, and free neutrons. The nuclei become increasingly small (pressure due to gravity overwhelming the strong force) until the core is reached, by definition the point where mostly neutrons exist. The expected hierarchy of phases of nuclear matter in the inner crust has been characterized as "nuclear pasta", with fewer voids and larger structures towards higher pressures. The composition of the superdense matter in the core remains uncertain. One model describes the core as superfluid neutron-degenerate matter (mostly neutrons, with some protons and electrons). More exotic forms of matter are possible, including degenerate strange matter (containing strange quarks in addition to up and down quarks), matter containing high-energy pions and kaons in addition to neutrons, or ultra-dense quark-degenerate matter.

== Radiation ==
Animation of a rotating pulsar. The sphere in the middle represents the neutron star, the curves indicate the magnetic field lines and the protruding cones represent the emission zones.

=== Pulsars ===
Neutron stars are detected from their electromagnetic radiation. Neutron stars are usually observed to pulse radio waves and other electromagnetic radiation, and neutron stars observed with pulses are called pulsars.

Pulsars' radiation is thought to be caused by particle acceleration near their magnetic poles, which need not be aligned with the rotational axis of the neutron star. It is thought that a large electrostatic field builds up near the magnetic poles, leading to electron emission. These electrons are magnetically accelerated along the field lines, leading to curvature radiation, with the radiation being strongly polarized towards the plane of curvature. In addition, high-energy photons can interact with lower-energy photons and the magnetic field for electron−positron pair production, which through electron–positron annihilation leads to further high-energy photons.

The radiation emanating from the magnetic poles of neutron stars can be described as magnetospheric radiation, in reference to the magnetosphere of the neutron star. It is not to be confused with magnetic dipole radiation, which is emitted because the magnetic axis is not aligned with the rotational axis, with a radiation frequency the same as the neutron star's rotational frequency.

If the axis of rotation of the neutron star is different from the magnetic axis, external viewers will only see these beams of radiation whenever the magnetic axis point towards them during the neutron star rotation. Therefore, periodic pulses are observed, at the same rate as the rotation of the neutron star.

In May 2022, astronomers reported an ultra-long-period radio-emitting neutron star PSR J0901−4046, with spin properties distinct from the known neutron stars. It is unclear how its radio emission is generated, and it challenges the current understanding of how pulsars evolve.

=== Non-pulsating neutron stars ===
In addition to pulsars, non-pulsating neutron stars have also been identified, although they may have minor periodic variation in luminosity. This seems to be a characteristic of the X-ray sources known as Central Compact Objects in supernova remnants (CCOs in SNRs), which are thought to be young, radio-quiet isolated neutron stars.

=== Spectra ===
In addition to radio emissions, neutron stars have also been identified in other parts of the electromagnetic spectrum. This includes visible light, near infrared, ultraviolet, X-rays, and gamma rays. Pulsars observed in X-rays are known as X-ray pulsars if accretion-powered, while those identified in visible light are known as optical pulsars. The majority of neutron stars detected, including those identified in optical, X-ray, and gamma rays, also emit radio waves; the Crab Pulsar produces electromagnetic emissions across the spectrum. However, there exist neutron stars called radio-quiet neutron stars, with no radio emissions detected.

== Rotation ==
Neutron stars rotate extremely rapidly after their formation due to the conservation of angular momentum; in analogy to spinning ice skaters pulling in their arms, the slow rotation of the original star's core speeds up as it shrinks. A newborn neutron star can rotate many times a second. A neutron star rotating at 600Hz will have sufficient centrifugal force to flatten the star into a oblate shape and cause the effective gravity force at the poles to be 20% stronger than that force at the equator.

=== Spin-down ===
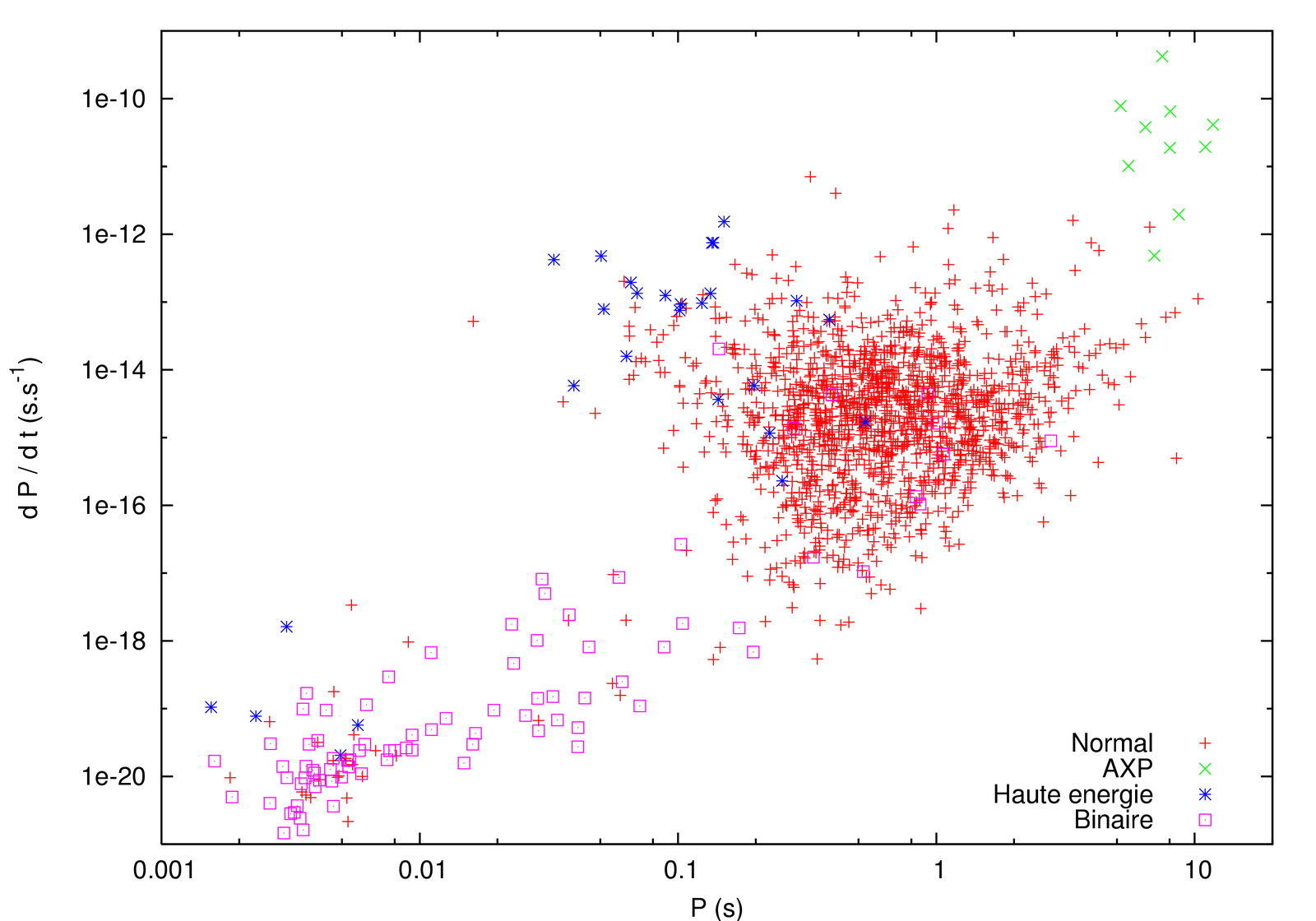
P–P-dot diagram for known rotation-powered pulsars (red), anomalous X-ray pulsars (green), high-energy emission pulsars (blue) and binary pulsars (pink)

Over time, neutron stars slow, as their rotating magnetic fields in effect radiate energy associated with the rotation; older neutron stars may take several seconds for each revolution. This is called spin-down. The rate at which a neutron star slows its rotation is usually constant and very small.

The periodic time (P) is the rotational period, the time for one rotation of a neutron star. The spin-down rate, the rate of slowing of rotation, is then given the symbol $\dot{P}$ (P-dot), the derivative of P with respect to time. It is defined as periodic time increase per unit time; it is a dimensionless quantity, but can be given the units of s⋅s^{−1} (seconds per second).

The spin-down rate (P-dot) of neutron stars usually falls within the range of 10^{−22} to 10^{−9} s⋅s^{−1}, with the shorter-period (or faster-rotating) observable neutron stars usually having smaller P-dot. As a neutron star ages, its rotation slows (P increases); eventually, the rate of rotation will become too slow to power the radio-emission mechanism, so radio emission from the neutron star can no longer be detected.

P and P-dot allow lower bounds on magnetic fields of neutron stars to be estimated. P and P-dot can be also used to calculate the characteristic age of a pulsar, but gives an estimate which is somewhat larger than the true age when it is applied to young pulsars.

P and P-dot can also be combined with neutron star's moment of inertia to estimate a quantity called spin-down luminosity, which is given the symbol $\dot{E}$ (E-dot). It is not the measured luminosity, but rather the calculated loss rate of rotational energy that would manifest itself as radiation. For neutron stars where the spin-down luminosity is comparable to the actual luminosity, the neutron stars are said to be "rotation-powered". The observed luminosity of the Crab Pulsar is comparable to the spin-down luminosity, supporting the model that rotational kinetic energy powers the radiation from it. With neutron stars such as magnetars, where the actual luminosity exceeds the spin-down luminosity by about a factor of 100, it is assumed that the luminosity is powered by magnetic dissipation, rather than being rotation-powered.

P and P-dot can also be plotted for neutron stars to create a P–P-dot diagram. It encodes a tremendous amount of information about the pulsar population and its properties, and has been likened to the Hertzsprung–Russell diagram in its importance for neutron stars.

=== Spin-up ===
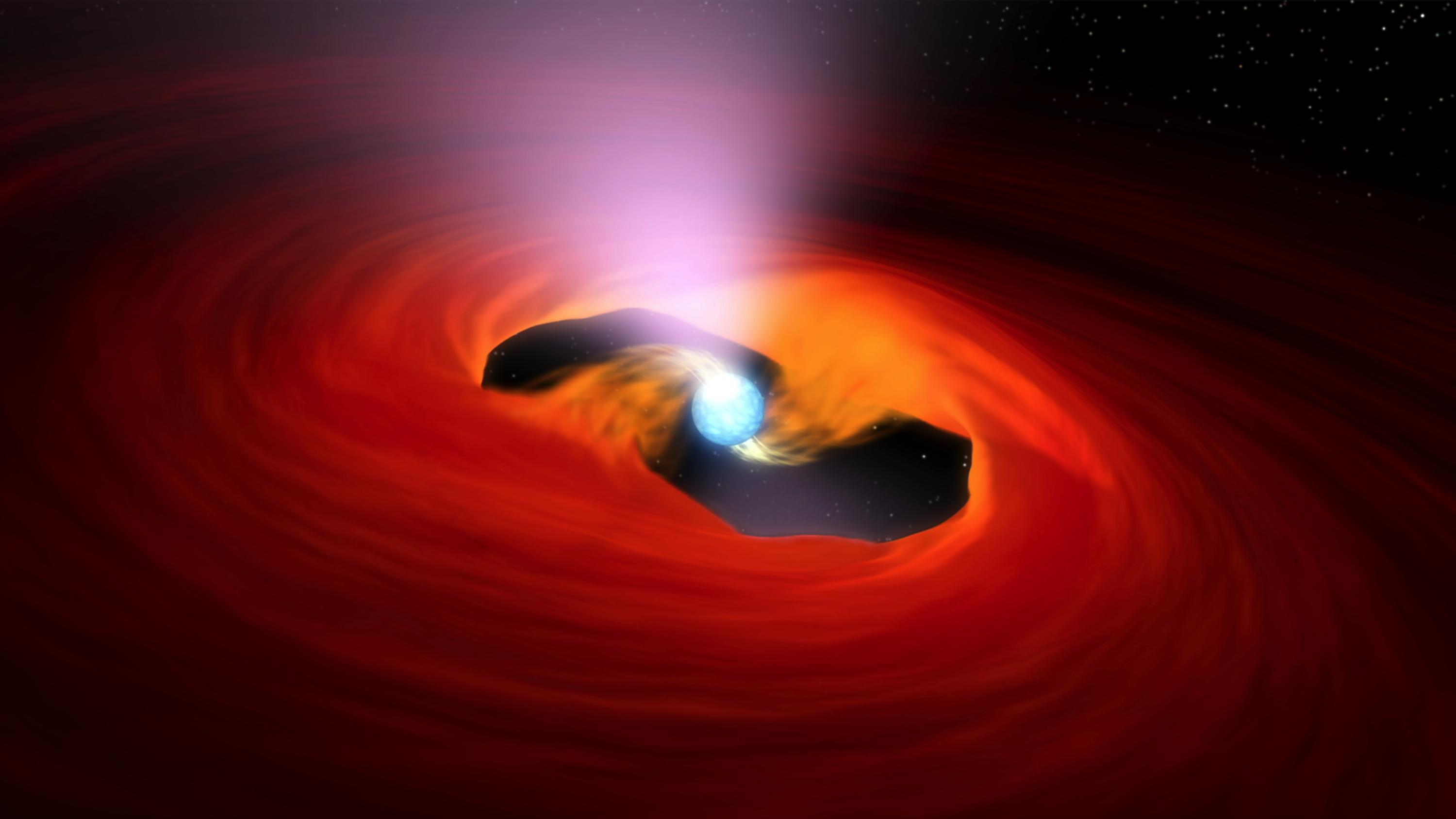
A computer simulation depicting a neutron star with accretion disk, spewing out X-rays through the magnetic axis

Neutron star rotational speeds can increase, a process known as spin-up. Sometimes neutron stars absorb orbiting matter from companion stars, increasing the rotation rate and reshaping the neutron star into an oblate spheroid. This causes an increase in the rate of rotation of the neutron star of over a hundred times per second in the case of millisecond pulsars.

The most-rapidly rotating neutron star currently known, PSR J1748−2446ad, rotates at 716 revolutions per second. A 2007 paper reported the detection of an X-ray burst oscillation, which provides an indirect measure of spin, of 1,122 Hz from the neutron star XTE J1739−285, suggesting 1,122 rotations a second. However, at present, this signal has only been seen once, and should be regarded as tentative until confirmed in another burst from that star.

=== Glitches and starquakes ===
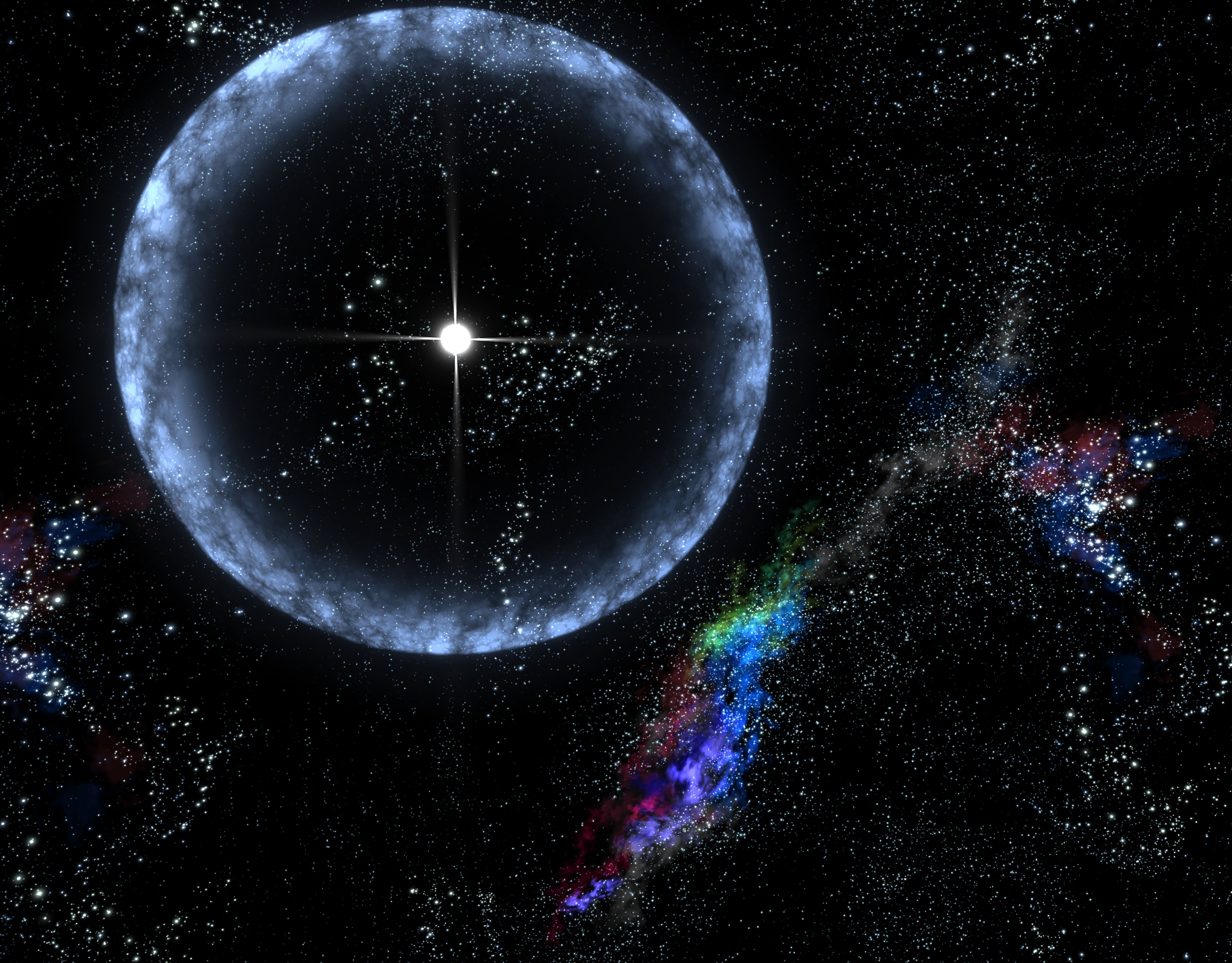
NASA artist's conception of a "starquake", or "stellar quake"

Sometimes a neutron star will undergo a glitch, a sudden small spin-up. Glitches are thought to be the effect of a starquake—as the rotation of the neutron star slows, its shape becomes more spherical. Due to the stiffness of the "neutron" crust, this happens as discrete events when the crust ruptures, creating a starquake similar to earthquakes. After the starquake, the star will have a smaller equatorial radius, and because angular momentum is conserved, its rotational speed has increased.

Starquakes occurring in magnetars, with a resulting glitch, is the leading hypothesis for the gamma-ray sources known as soft gamma repeaters.

Other work, however, suggests that a starquake would not release sufficient energy for a neutron star glitch; it has been suggested that glitches may instead be caused by pinning and de-pinning of superfluid vortices in the inner crust and/or outer core of the neutron star, which nuclear theory calculations predict will consist of neutron superfluids. On this view, the superfluid vortices pin to the crustal lattice sites, or impurities, and remain pinned as the crust spins down. Since the configuration of vortices dictates the rotation of the superfluid, and the vortices remain stationary relative to the crust frame, the superfluid cannot spin down with the crust, and thus a rotational lag develops between the crust and the superfluid. It is thought that once this lag reaches a critical point, a trigger causes many vortices to de-pin collectively, and their collective outward motion transfers angular momentum to the crust. Many suggestions have been made about what might trigger the de-pinning, including starquakes, vortex avalanches, and various hydrodynamic instabilities. Currently no consensus exists on which trigger takes place, owing to observational constraints of the interior of the star.

=== Anti-glitches ===
An anti-glitch, a sudden small spin-down, of a neutron star has also been reported. It occurred in the magnetar 1E 2259+586, that in one case produced an X-ray luminosity increase of a factor of 20, and a significant spin-down rate change. Current neutron star models do not predict this behavior. If the cause were internal, then this suggests differential rotation of the solid outer crust and the superfluid component of the magnetar's inner structure.

== Population and distances ==
At present, there are about 3,200 known neutron stars in the Milky Way and the Magellanic Clouds, the majority of which have been detected as radio pulsars. Neutron stars are mostly concentrated along the disk of the Milky Way, although the spread perpendicular to the disk is large because the supernova explosion process can impart high translational speeds (400 km/s) to the newly formed neutron star.

Some of the closest-known neutron stars are RX J1856.5−3754, which is about 400 light-years from Earth, and PSR J0108−1431 about 424 light-years. RX J1856.5–3754 is a member of a close group of neutron stars called the Magnificent Seven. Another nearby neutron star that was detected transiting the backdrop of the constellation Ursa Minor has been nicknamed Calvera by its Canadian and American discoverers, after the villain in the 1960 film The Magnificent Seven. This rapidly moving object was discovered using the ROSAT Bright Source Catalog.

Neutron stars are only detectable with modern technology during the earliest stages of their lives (almost always less than 1 million years) and are vastly outnumbered by older neutron stars that would only be detectable through their black-body radiation and gravitational effects on other stars.

== Binary neutron star systems ==
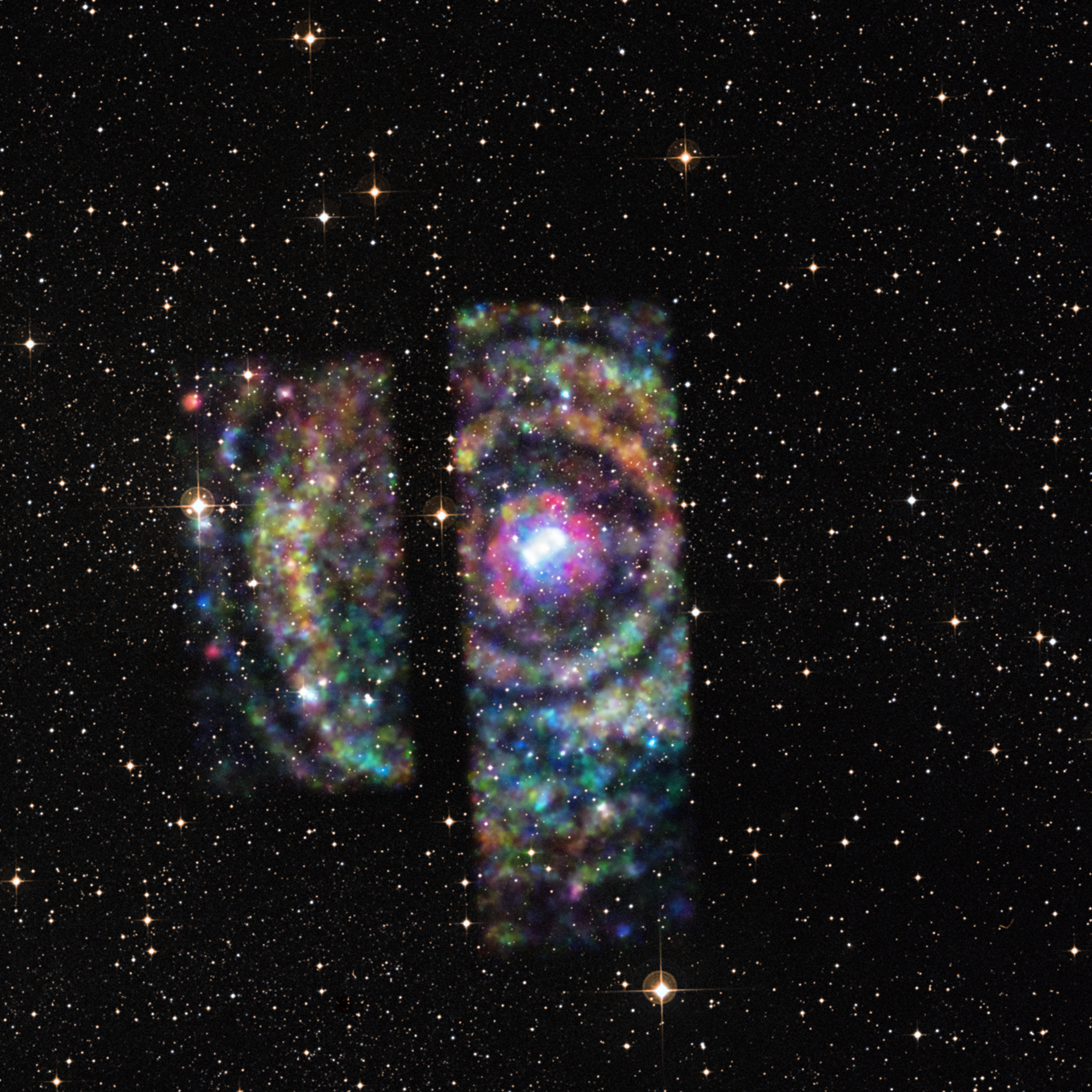
Circinus X-1: X-ray light rings from a binary neutron star (24 June 2015; Chandra X-ray Observatory)

About 5% of all known neutron stars are members of a binary system. The formation and evolution of binary neutron stars and double neutron stars can be a complex process. Neutron stars have been observed in binaries with ordinary main-sequence stars, red giants, white dwarfs, or other neutron stars. According to modern theories of binary evolution, it is expected that neutron stars also exist in binary systems with black hole companions. The merger of binaries containing two neutron stars, or a neutron star and a black hole, has been observed through the emission of gravitational waves.

=== X-ray binaries ===
Binary systems containing neutron stars often emit X-rays, which are emitted by hot gas as it falls towards the surface of the neutron star. The source of the gas is the companion star, the outer layers of which can be stripped off by the gravitational field of the neutron star if the two stars are sufficiently close. As the neutron star accretes this gas, its mass can increase; if enough mass is accreted, the neutron star may collapse into a black hole.

=== Neutron star binary mergers and nucleosynthesis ===
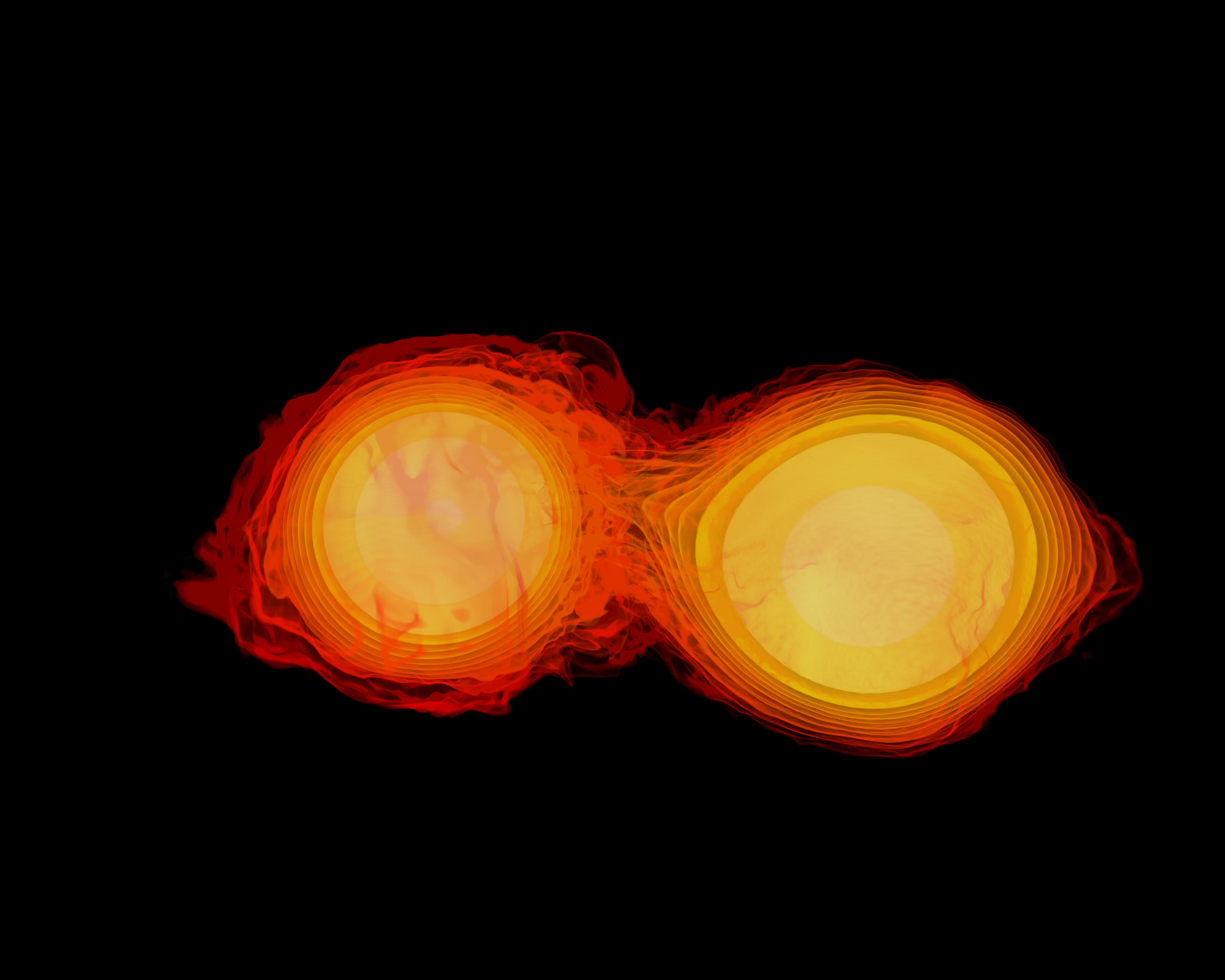
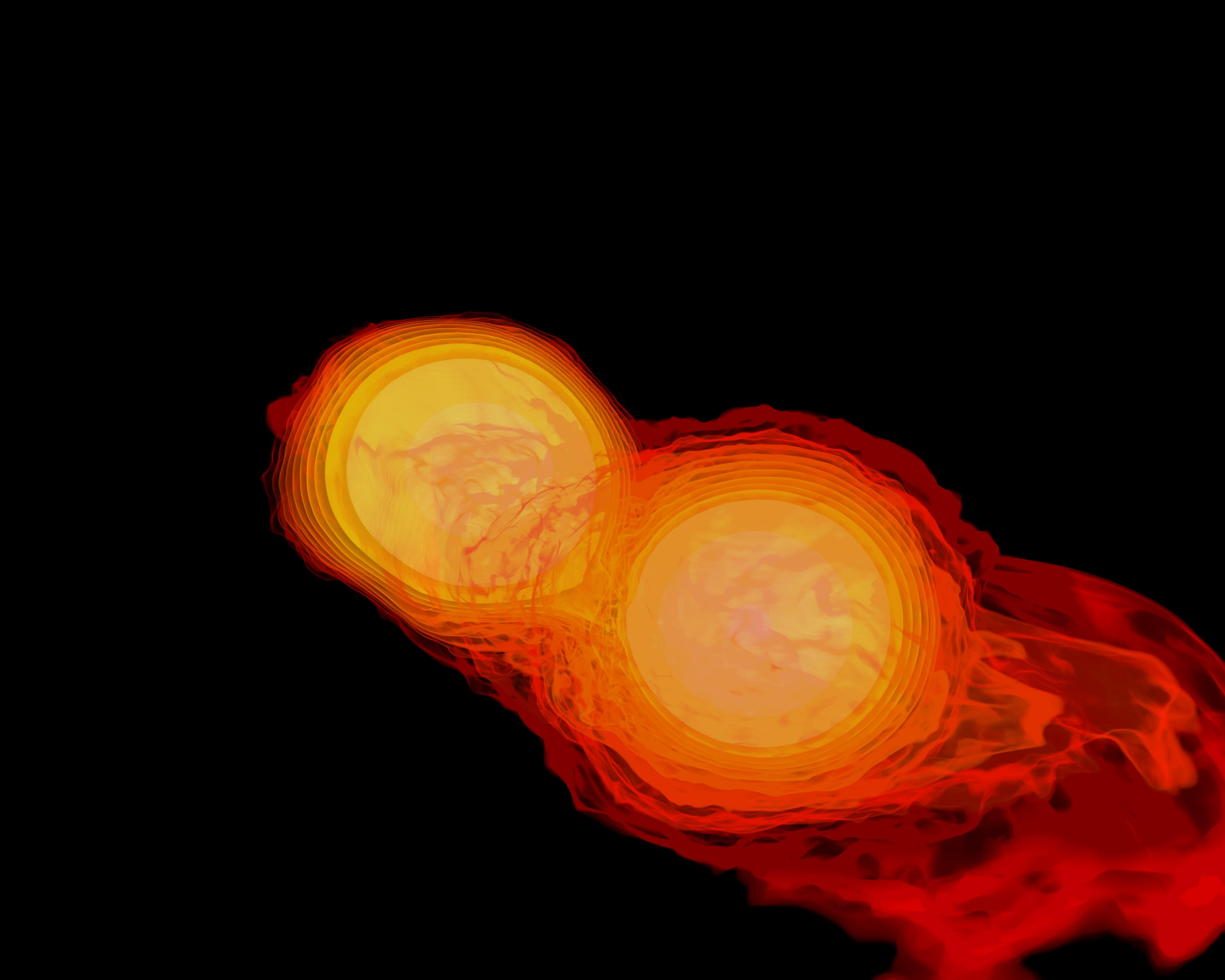
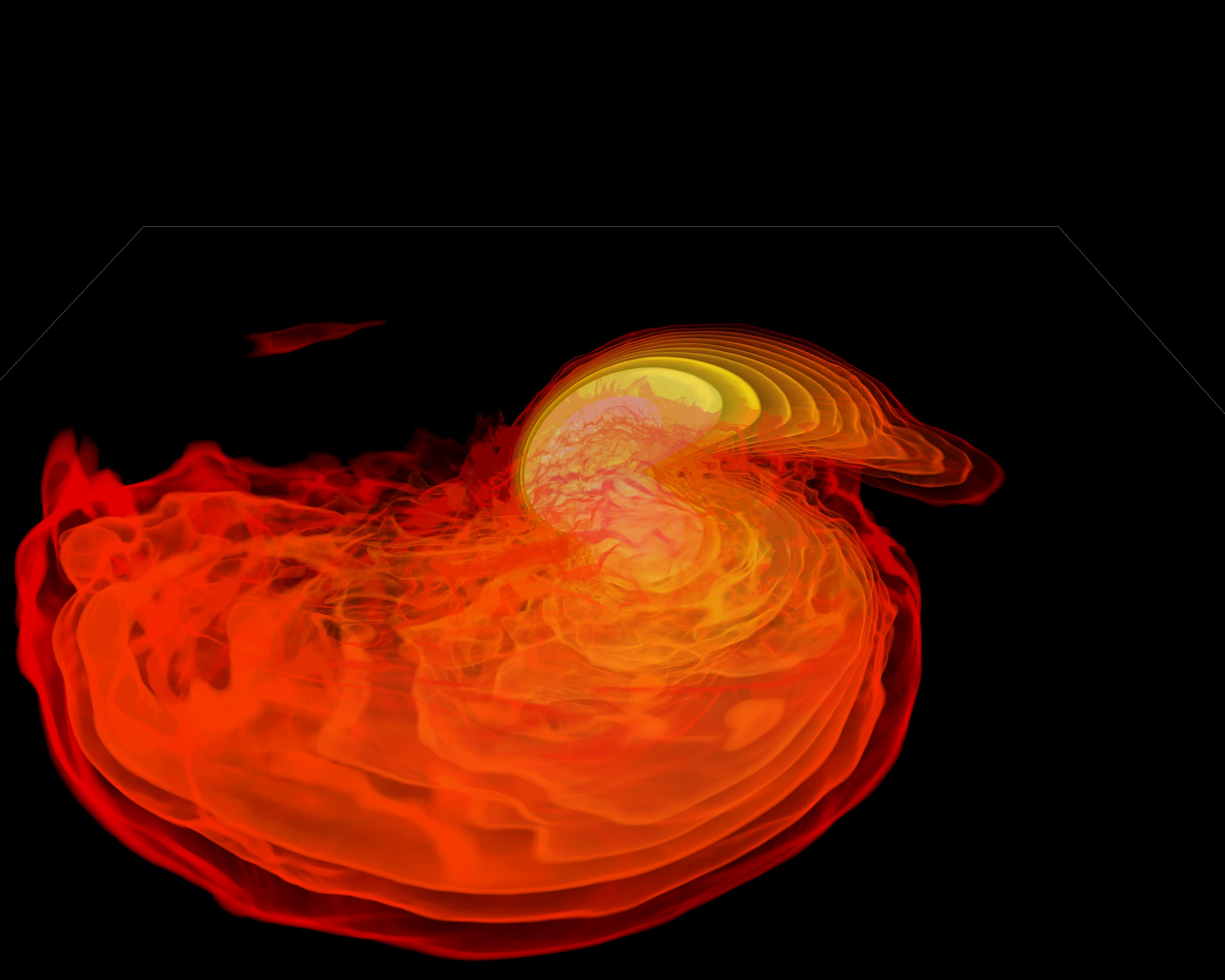
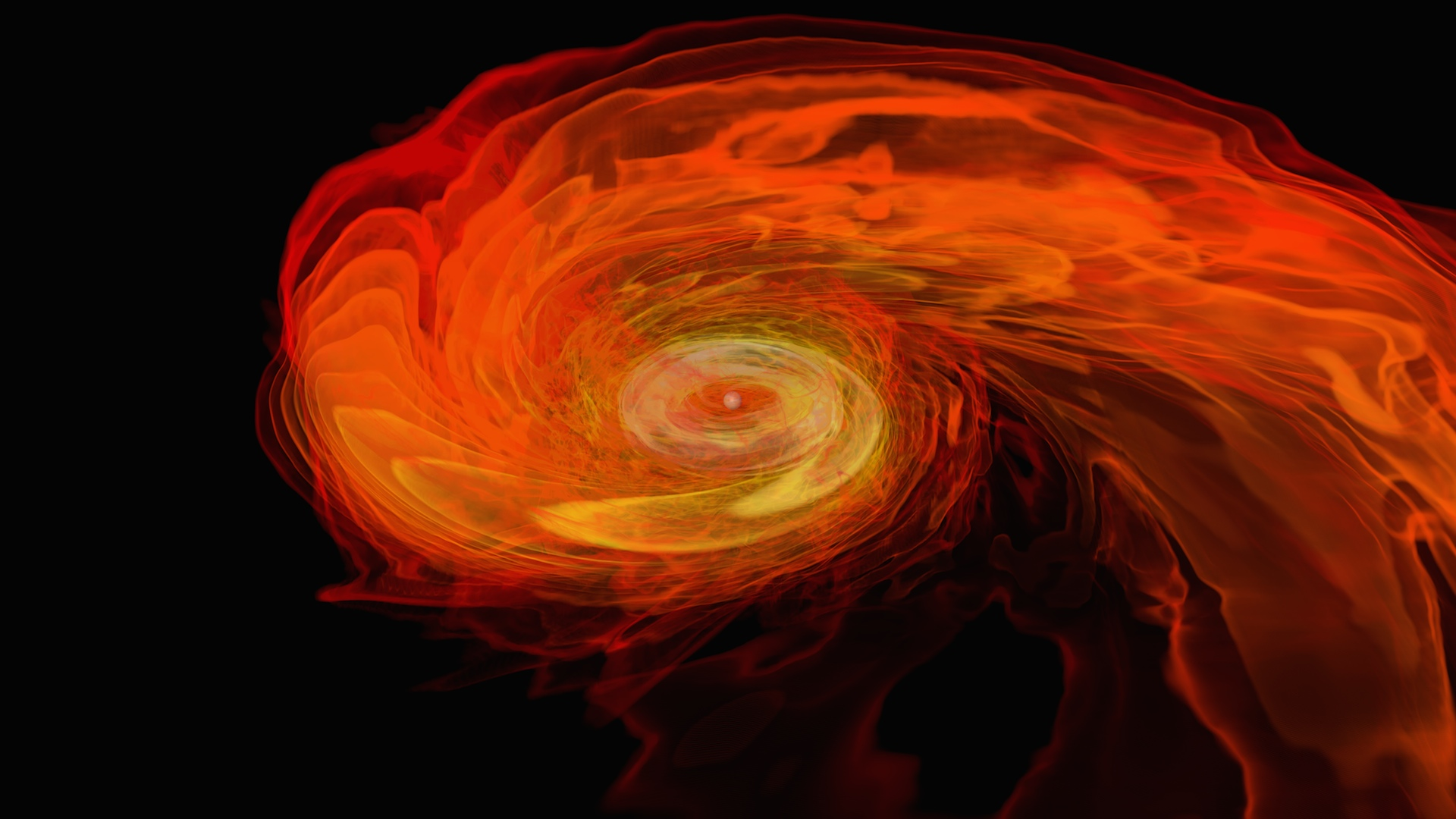
Four snapshots from a computer simulation of a neutron star merger. From top left:
1. The two neutron stars make initial contact
2. Immense tidal forces begin to disrupt the outer layers of the neutron stars
3. The neutron stars are completely tidally disrupted
4. A black hole forms, surrounded by an accretion disc

The distance between two neutron stars in a close binary system is observed to shrink as gravitational waves are emitted. Ultimately, the neutron stars will come into contact and coalesce. The coalescence of binary neutron stars is one of the leading models for the origin of short gamma-ray bursts. Strong evidence for this model came from the observation of a kilonova associated with the short-duration gamma-ray burst GRB 130603B, and was finally confirmed by detection of gravitational wave GW170817 and short GRB 170817A by LIGO, Virgo, and 70 observatories covering the electromagnetic spectrum observing the event. The light emitted in the kilonova is believed to come from the radioactive decay of material ejected in the merger of the two neutron stars. The merger momentarily creates an environment of such extreme neutron flux that the r-process can occur; this—as opposed to supernova nucleosynthesis—may be responsible for the production of around half the isotopes in chemical elements beyond iron.

== Planets ==
Neutron stars can host exoplanets. These can be original, circumbinary, captured, or the result of a second round of planet formation. Pulsars can also strip the atmosphere off from a star, leaving a planetary-mass remnant, which may be understood as a chthonian planet or a stellar object depending on interpretation. For pulsars, such pulsar planets can be detected with the pulsar timing method, which allows for high precision and detection of much smaller planets than with other methods. Two systems have been definitively confirmed. The first exoplanets ever to be detected were the three planets Draugr, Poltergeist and Phobetor around the pulsar Lich, discovered in 1992–1994. Of these, Draugr is the smallest exoplanet ever detected, at a mass of twice that of the Moon. Another system is PSR B1620−26, where a circumbinary planet orbits a neutron star-white dwarf binary system. Also, there are several unconfirmed candidates. Pulsar planets receive little visible light, but massive amounts of ionizing radiation and high-energy stellar wind, which makes them rather hostile environments to life as presently understood.

== History of discoveries ==
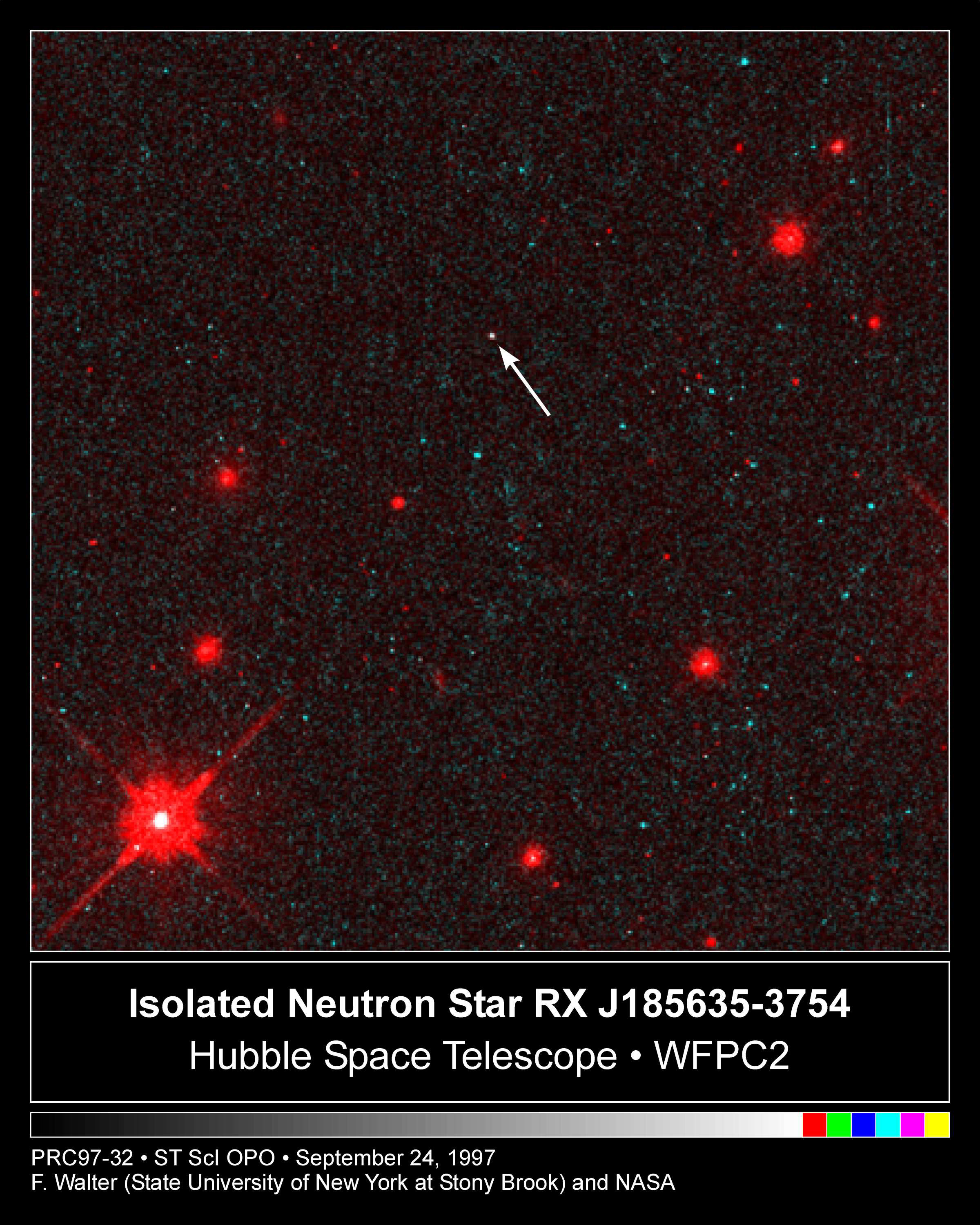
The first direct observation of an isolated neutron star in visible light. The neutron star is RX J1856.5−3754.

At the meeting of the American Physical Society in December 1933 (the proceedings were published in January 1934), Walter Baade and Fritz Zwicky proposed the existence of neutron stars, (Note: Even before the discovery of neutron, in 1931, neutron stars were anticipated by Lev Landau, who wrote about stars where "atomic nuclei come in close contact, forming one gigantic nucleus". However, the widespread opinion that Landau predicted neutron stars proves to be wrong.) less than two years after the discovery of the neutron by James Chadwick. In seeking an explanation for the origin of a supernova, they tentatively proposed that in supernova explosions ordinary stars are turned into stars that consist of extremely closely packed neutrons that they called neutron stars. Baade and Zwicky correctly proposed at that time that the release of the gravitational binding energy of the neutron stars powers the supernova: "In the supernova process, mass in bulk is annihilated". Neutron stars were thought to be too faint to be detectable and little work was done on them until November 1967, when Franco Pacini pointed out that if the neutron stars were spinning and had large magnetic fields, then electromagnetic waves would be emitted. Unknown to him, radio astronomer Antony Hewish and his graduate student Jocelyn Bell at Cambridge were shortly to detect radio pulses from stars that are now believed to be highly magnetized, rapidly spinning neutron stars, known as pulsars.

In 1965, Antony Hewish and Samuel Okoye discovered "an unusual source of high radio brightness temperature in the Crab Nebula". This source turned out to be the Crab Pulsar that resulted from the great supernova of 1054.

In 1967, Iosif Shklovsky examined the X-ray and optical observations of Scorpius X-1 and correctly concluded that the radiation comes from a neutron star at the stage of accretion.

In 1967, Jocelyn Bell Burnell and Antony Hewish discovered regular radio pulses from PSR B1919+21. This pulsar was later interpreted as an isolated, rotating neutron star. The energy source of the pulsar is the rotational energy of the neutron star. The majority of known neutron stars (about 2000, as of 2010) have been discovered as pulsars, emitting regular radio pulses.

In 1968, Richard V. E. Lovelace and collaborators discovered period $P\!\approx 33$ ms of the Crab Pulsar using Arecibo Observatory. After this discovery, scientists concluded that pulsars were rotating neutron stars. Before that, many scientists believed that pulsars were pulsating white dwarfs.

In 1971, Riccardo Giacconi, Herbert Gursky, Ed Kellogg, R. Levinson, E. Schreier, and H. Tananbaum discovered 4.8-second pulsations in an X-ray source in the constellation Centaurus, Cen X-3. They interpreted this as resulting from a rotating hot neutron star. The energy source is gravitational and results from a rain of gas falling onto the surface of the neutron star from a companion star or the interstellar medium.

In 1974, Antony Hewish was awarded the Nobel Prize in Physics "for his decisive role in the discovery of pulsars" without Jocelyn Bell who shared in the discovery.

In 1974, Joseph Taylor and Russell Hulse discovered the first binary pulsar, PSR B1913+16, which consists of two neutron stars (one seen as a pulsar) orbiting around their center of mass. Albert Einstein's general theory of relativity predicts that massive objects in short binary orbits should emit gravitational waves, and thus that their orbit should decay with time. This was indeed observed, precisely as general relativity predicts, and in 1993, Taylor and Hulse were awarded the Nobel Prize in Physics for this discovery.

In 1982, Don Backer and colleagues discovered the first millisecond pulsar, PSR B1937+21. This object spins 642 times per second, a value that placed fundamental constraints on the mass and radius of neutron stars. Many millisecond pulsars were later discovered, but PSR B1937+21 remained the fastest-spinning known pulsar for 24 years, until PSR J1748−2446ad (which spins ~716 times a second) was discovered.

In 2003, Marta Burgay and colleagues discovered the first double neutron star system where both components are detectable as pulsars, PSR J0737−3039. The discovery of this system allows a total of 5 different tests of general relativity, some of these with unprecedented precision.

In 2010, Paul Demorest and colleagues measured the mass of the millisecond pulsar PSR J1614−2230 to be 1.97±0.04 M_{☉}, using Shapiro delay. This was substantially higher than any previously measured neutron star mass (1.67 M_{☉}, see PSR J1903+0327), and places strong constraints on the interior composition of neutron stars.

In 2013, John Antoniadis and colleagues measured the mass of PSR J0348+0432 to be 2.01±0.04 M_{☉}, using white dwarf spectroscopy. This confirmed the existence of such massive stars using a different method. Furthermore, this allowed, for the first time, a test of general relativity using such a massive neutron star.

In August 2017, LIGO and Virgo made first detection of gravitational waves produced by colliding neutron stars (GW170817), leading to further discoveries about neutron stars.

In October 2018, astronomers reported that GRB 150101B, a gamma-ray burst event detected in 2015, may be directly related to the historic GW170817 and associated with the merger of two neutron stars. The similarities between the two events, in terms of gamma ray, optical and x-ray emissions, as well as to the nature of the associated host galaxies, are "striking", suggesting the two separate events may both be the result of the merger of neutron stars, and both may be a kilonova, which may be more common in the universe than previously understood, according to the researchers.

In July 2019, astronomers reported that a new method to determine the Hubble constant, and resolve the discrepancy of earlier methods, has been proposed based on the mergers of pairs of neutron stars, following the detection of the neutron star merger of GW170817. Their measurement of the Hubble constant is 70.3+5.3
−5.0 (km/s)/Mpc.

A 2020 study by University of Southampton PhD student Fabian Gittins suggested that surface irregularities ("mountains") may only be fractions of a millimeter tall (about 0.000003% of the neutron star's diameter), hundreds of times smaller than previously predicted, a result bearing implications for the non-detection of gravitational waves from spinning neutron stars.

Using the James Webb Space Telescope, astronomer identified a neutron star within the remnants of the Supernova 1987A stellar explosion.

== Subtypes ==
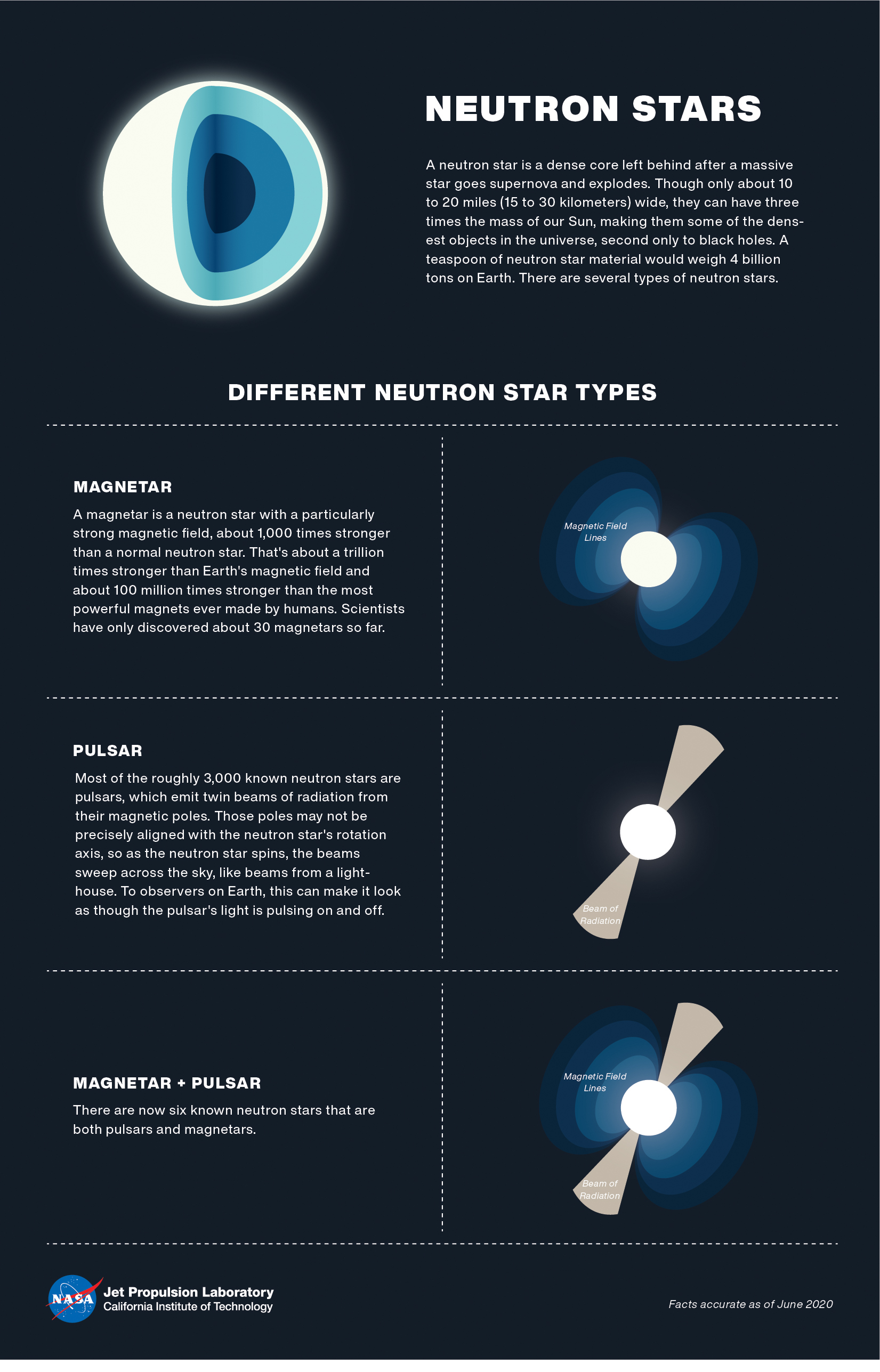
Different types of neutron stars

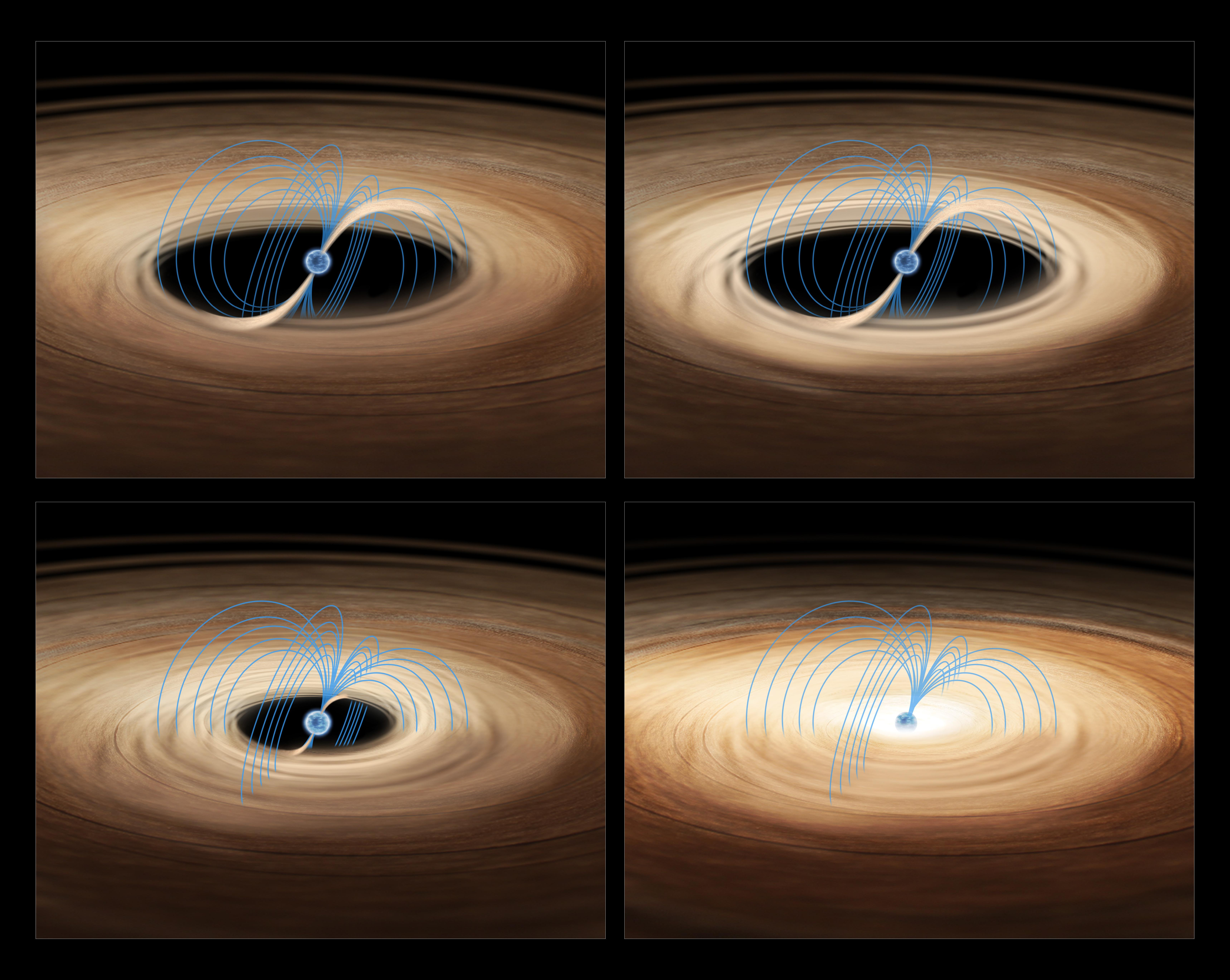
Computer renders of a neutron star with accretion disk, with magnetic field lines projected, showing bursts of powerful X-rays. The simulations are taken from 2017 data from NASA's NuSTAR and Swift, and ESA's XMM-Newton observatories.

There are a number of types of object that consist of or contain a neutron star:

- Isolated neutron star (INS): not in a binary system.
  - Rotation-powered pulsar (RPP or "radio pulsar"): neutron stars that emit directed pulses of radiation towards us at regular intervals (due to their strong magnetic fields)
    - Rotating radio transient (RRATs): thought to be pulsars which emit more sporadically and/or with higher pulse-to-pulse variability than the bulk of the known pulsars
  - Magnetar: a neutron star with an extremely strong magnetic field (1,000 times more than a regular neutron star), and long rotation periods (5 to 12 seconds)
    - Soft gamma repeater (SGR)
    - Anomalous X-ray pulsar (AXP)
  - Radio-quiet neutron stars
    - X-ray-dim isolated neutron stars
    - Central compact objects in supernova remnants (CCOs in SNRs): young, radio-quiet non-pulsating X-ray sources, thought to be isolated neutron stars surrounded by supernova remnants
- X-ray pulsars or "accretion-powered pulsars": a class of X-ray binaries
  - Low-mass X-ray binary pulsars: a class of low-mass X-ray binaries (LMXB), a pulsar with a main-sequence star, white dwarf or red giant
    - Millisecond pulsar (MSP) ("recycled pulsar")
      - "Spider Pulsar", a pulsar where their companion is a semi-degenerate star
        - "Black Widow" pulsar, a pulsar that falls under the "Spider Pulsar" if the companion has extremely low mass (less than 0.1 M_{☉})
        - "Redback" pulsar, are if the companion is more massive
      - Sub-millisecond pulsar
    - X-ray burster: a neutron star with a low-mass binary companion from which matter is accreted resulting in irregular bursts of energy from the surface of the neutron star
  - Intermediate-mass X-ray binary pulsars: a class of intermediate-mass X-ray binaries (IMXB), a pulsar with an intermediate mass star
  - High-mass X-ray binary pulsars: a class of high-mass X-ray binaries (HMXB), a pulsar with a massive star
  - Binary pulsars: a pulsar with a binary companion, often a white dwarf or neutron star.
  - X-ray tertiary (theorized).

There are also a number of theorized compact stars with similar properties that are not actually neutron stars.

- Protoneutron star (PNS), a theorized intermediate–stage object that cools and contracts to form a neutron star or a black hole
- Exotic star: A hypothetical compact star which is made up of matter denser than neutron matter, possibly containing quarks, hyperons or other subatomic particles beyond neutrons or protons.
  - Thorne–Żytkow object: currently a hypothetical merger of a neutron star into a red giant star.
    - Quark star: currently a hypothetical type of neutron star composed of quark matter, or strange matter. As of 2018, there are three candidates found.
  - Electroweak star: currently a hypothetical type of extremely heavy neutron star, in which the quarks are converted to leptons through the electroweak interaction, but the gravitational collapse of the neutron star is prevented by radiation pressure. As of 2018, there is no evidence for their existence.
  - Preon star: currently a hypothetical type of neutron star composed of preon matter. As of 2018, there is no evidence for the existence of preons.

== Examples of neutron stars ==
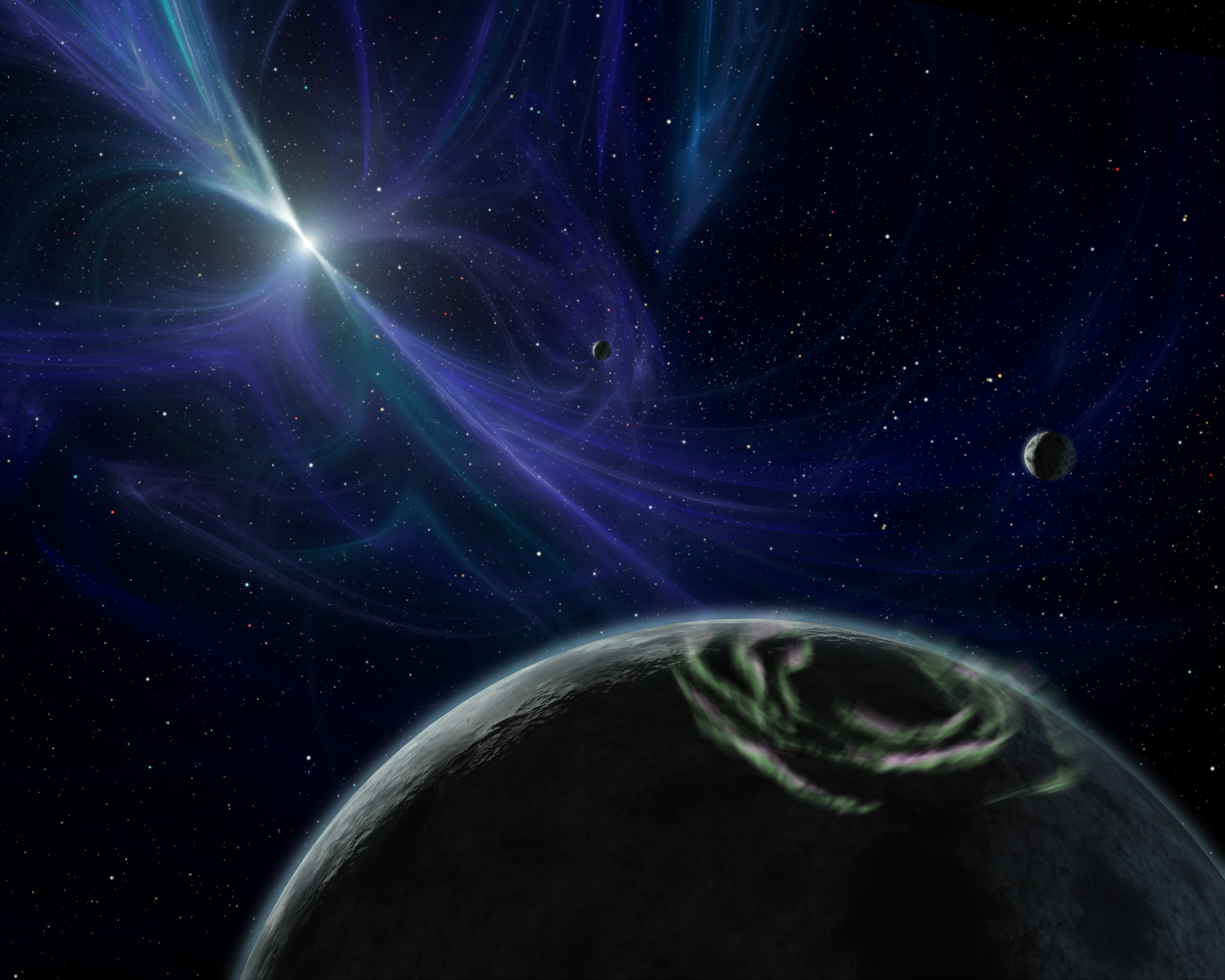
An artist's conception of the pulsar planet PSR B1257+12 C, with bright aurorae

- Black Widow Pulsar – a millisecond pulsar that is very massive
- PSR J0952−0607 – the heaviest neutron star with 2.35+0.17
  −0.17 M_{☉}, a type of Black Widow Pulsar
- LGM-1 (now known as PSR B1919+21) – the first recognized radio-pulsar. It was discovered by Jocelyn Bell Burnell in 1967.
- PSR B1257+12 (also known as Lich) – the first neutron star discovered with planets (a millisecond pulsar)
- PSR B1509−58 – source of the "Hand of God" photo shot by the Chandra X-ray Observatory
- RX J1856.5−3754 – the closest neutron star
- The Magnificent Seven – a group of nearby, X-ray dim isolated neutron stars
- PSR J0348+0432 – the most massive neutron star with a well-constrained mass, 2.01±0.04 M_{☉}
- SWIFT J1756.9−2508 – a millisecond pulsar with a stellar-type companion with planetary range mass (below brown dwarf)
- SWIFT J1818.0−1607 – the youngest-known magnetar

== Gallery ==
Neutron stars containing 500,000 Earth-masses in 25-kilometer-diameter (16 mi) sphere, overlaid on top of New York City for scale

Neutron stars colliding

Neutron star collision

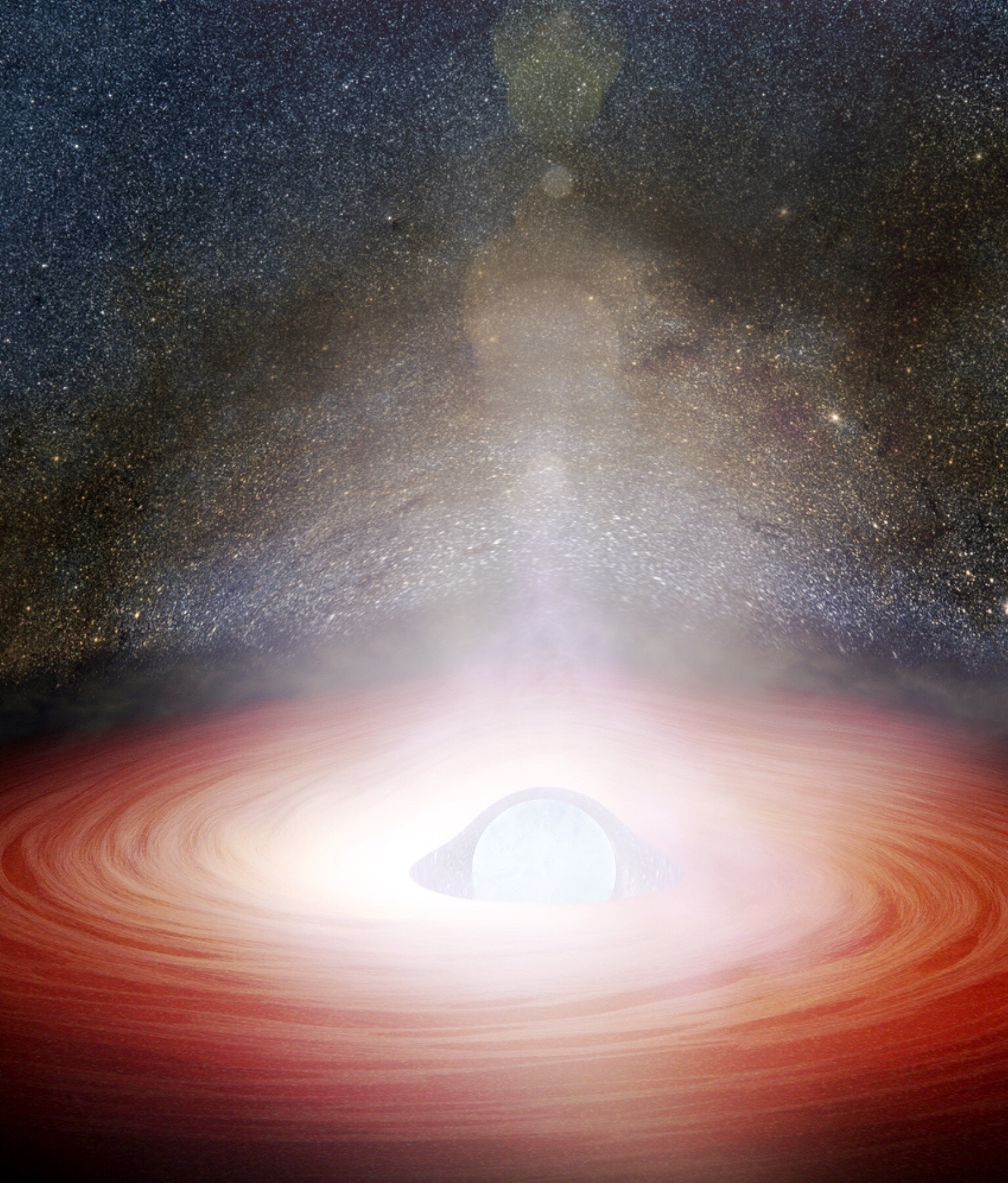
Artist's impression of a neutron star bending light

== See also ==
- IRAS 00500+6713 (in 10,000 y)
- List of neutron stars
- Neutron stars in fiction
  - Stars in fiction § Neutron stars
- Neutronium
- Planck star
- Preon-degenerate matter
- Rotating radio transient
