= PSR J1614−2230 =

Pulsar–white dwarf binary system in Scorpius constellation

Observation data Epoch J2000 Equinox ICRS
- Constellation: Scorpius
- Right ascension: 16^{h} 14^{m} 36.5051^{s}
- Declination: −22° 30′ 31.081″

Characteristics
- Spectral type: Pulsar

Astrometry
Distance	3,900 ly (1,200 pc)

Details
Mass	1.908 M_{☉}
Radius	13 ± 2 km, 1.87(29) × 10^{-5} R_{☉}
Rotation	3.150807655690673 ms
Age	5.2 Gyr

Other designations
- PSR J1614–22

Database references
SIMBAD	data

PSR J1614–2230 is a pulsar in a binary system with a white dwarf in the constellation Scorpius. It was discovered in 2006 with the Parkes telescope in a survey of unidentified gamma ray sources in the Energetic Gamma Ray Experiment Telescope catalog. PSR J1614–2230 is a millisecond pulsar, a type of neutron star, that spins on its axis roughly 317.37 times per second, corresponding to a period of 3.1508 milliseconds. Like all pulsars, it emits radiation in a beam, similar to a lighthouse. Emission from PSR J1614–2230 is observed as pulses at the spin period of PSR J1614–2230. The pulsed nature of its emission allows for the arrival of individual pulses to be timed. By measuring the arrival time of pulses, astronomers observed the delay of pulse arrivals from PSR J1614–2230 when it was passing behind its companion from the vantage point of Earth. By measuring this delay, known as the Shapiro delay, astronomers determined the mass of PSR J1614–2230 and its companion. The team performing the observations found that the mass of PSR J1614–2230 is 1.97 ± 0.04 M_{☉}. This mass made PSR J1614–2230 the most massive known neutron star at the time of discovery, and rules out many neutron star equations of state that include exotic matter such as hyperons and kaon condensates.

In 2013, a slightly higher neutron star mass measurement was announced for PSR J0348+0432, 2.01 ± 0.04 M_{☉}. This confirmed the existence of such massive neutron stars using a different measuring technique.

After further high-precision timing of the pulsar, the mass measurement for J1614–2230 was updated to 1.908 ± 0.016 M_{☉} in 2018.

== Background ==
Schematic view of a pulsar. The sphere in the middle represents the neutron star, the curves indicate the magnetic field lines and the protruding cones represent the emission beams.

Pulsars were discovered in 1967 by Jocelyn Bell and her adviser Antony Hewish using the Interplanetary Scintillation Array. Franco Pacini and Thomas Gold quickly put forth the idea that pulsars are highly magnetized rotating neutron stars, which form as a result of a supernova at the end of the life of stars more massive than about 10 M_{☉}. The radiation emitted by pulsars is caused by interaction of the plasma surrounding the neutron star with its rapidly rotating magnetic field. This interaction leads to emission "in the pattern of a rotating beacon," as emission escapes along the magnetic poles of the neutron star. The "rotating beacon" property of pulsars arises from the misalignment of their magnetic poles with their rotational poles. Historically, pulsars have been discovered at radio wavelengths where emission is strong, but space telescopes that operate in the gamma ray wavelengths have also discovered pulsars.

== Observations ==
The Energetic Gamma-Ray Experiment Telescope (EGRET) identified a half dozen known pulsars at gamma ray wavelengths. Many of the sources it detected had no known counterparts at other wavelengths. In order to see whether any of these sources were pulsars, Fronefield Crawford et al. used the Parkes telescope to conduct a survey of the EGRET sources located in the plane of the Milky Way that lacked a known counterpart. In the search, they discovered PSR J1614–2230, and concluded that it might be a counterpart to a gamma ray source near the same location. The radio observations revealed that PSR J1614–2230 had a companion, likely a white dwarf. The observed orbital parameters of the system indicated a minimum companion mass of 0.4 M_{☉}, and an orbital period of 8.6866 days.

Paul Demorest et al. used the Green Bank Telescope at the National Radio Astronomy Observatory to observe the system through a complete 8.68661942256 day orbit, recording the pulse arrival times from PSR J1614–2230 over this period. After accounting for factors that would alter pulse arrival times from exactly matching its period of 3.150807655690673 milliseconds, including the orbital parameters of the binary system, the spin of the pulsar, and the motion of the system, Demorest et al. determined the delay in the arrival of pulses that resulted from the pulse having to travel past the companion to PSR J1614–2230 on its way to Earth. This delay is a consequence of general relativity known as the Shapiro delay, and the magnitude of the delay is dependent upon the mass of the white dwarf companion. The best fit companion mass was 0.500 ± 0.006 M_{☉}. Knowing the companion mass and orbital elements then provided enough information to determine the mass of PSR J1614–2230 to be 1.97 ± 0.04 M_{☉}.

The measurement was later improved based on observations of the pulses over several years.

== Significance ==
The conditions in neutron stars are very different from those encountered on Earth, as a result of the high density and gravity of neutron stars; their masses are of order the mass of a star, but they have sizes around 10 to 13 kilometres (6 to 8 mi) in radius, which is comparable to the size of the center of large cities such as London. Neutron stars also have the property that as they become more massive, their diameter decreases. The mass of PSR J1614–2230 is the second highest of all the known neutron stars. The existence of a neutron star with such a high mass constrains the composition and structure of neutron stars, both of which are poorly understood. The reason for this is that the maximum mass of a neutron star is dependent upon its composition. A neutron star composed of matter such as hyperons or kaon condensates would collapse to form a black hole before it could reach the observed mass of PSR J1614–2230, meaning neutron star models that include such matter are strongly constrained by this result.
