= Electron degeneracy pressure =

Repulsive force in quantum mechanics

In astrophysics and condensed matter physics, electron degeneracy pressure is a quantum mechanical effect critical to understanding the stability of white dwarf stars and metal solids. It is a manifestation of the more general phenomenon of quantum degeneracy pressure.

The term "degenerate" here is not related to degenerate energy levels, but to Fermi–Dirac statistics close to the zero-temperature limit (temperatures much lower than the Fermi temperature, which for metals is about 10,000 K).

In metals and in white dwarf stars, electrons can be modeled as a gas of non-interacting electrons confined to a finite volume. Although there are strong electromagnetic forces between the negatively charged electrons, these forces are approximately balanced by the positive nuclei and so can be neglected in the simplest models. The pressure exerted by the electrons is related to their kinetic energy. The degeneracy pressure is most prominent at low temperatures: If electrons were classical particles, the movement of the electrons would cease at absolute zero and the pressure of the electron gas would vanish. However, since electrons are quantum mechanical particles that obey the Pauli exclusion principle, no two electrons can occupy the same state, and it is not possible for all the electrons to have zero kinetic energy. Instead, the confinement makes the allowed energy levels quantized, and the electrons fill them from the bottom upwards. If many electrons are confined to a small volume, on average the electrons have a large kinetic energy, and a large pressure is exerted.

In white dwarf stars, the positive nuclei are completely ionized – disassociated from the electrons – and closely packed – a million times more dense than the Sun. At this density gravity exerts immense force pulling the nuclei together. This force is balanced by the electron degeneracy pressure keeping the star stable.

In metals, the positive nuclei are partly ionized and spaced by normal interatomic distances. Gravity has negligible effect; the positive ion cores are attracted to the negatively charged electron gas. This force is balanced by the electron degeneracy pressure.

== From the Fermi gas theory ==
Pressure vs temperature curves of classical and quantum ideal gases (Fermi gas, Bose gas) in three dimensions. Pauli repulsion in fermions gives them an additional pressure over an equivalent classical gas, most significantly at low temperature.

Electrons are members of a family of particles known as fermions. Fermions, like the proton or the neutron, follow Pauli's principle and Fermi–Dirac statistics. In general, for an ensemble of non-interacting fermions, also known as a Fermi gas, each particle can be treated independently with a single-fermion energy given by the purely kinetic term,
$$\ E = \frac{\ p^2 }{\; 2\;m \;}\ ,$$
where p is the momentum of one particle and m its mass. Every possible momentum state of an electron within this volume up to the Fermi momentum p_{F} being occupied.

The degeneracy pressure at zero temperature can be computed as
$$P= \frac{\;\! 2 \;\!}{ 3 }\;\!\frac{~~ E_\mathsf{tot} }{ V } = \frac{\;\! 2 \;\!}{ 3 }\;\!\frac{\ p_\mathsf{F}^5 }{\ 10\;\!\pi^2\;\! m\;\! \hbar^3 }\ ,$$
where V is the total volume of the system and E_{tot} is the total energy of the ensemble. Specifically for the electron degeneracy pressure, m is substituted by the electron mass m_{e} and the Fermi momentum is obtained from the Fermi energy, so the electron degeneracy pressure is given by
$$P_\mathsf{e} = \frac{\ (3\;\!\pi^2)^{\tfrac{2}{3}}\;\!\hbar^2 }{ 5\;\! m_\mathsf{e} }\ \rho_\mathsf{e}^{\tfrac{5}{3}}\ ,$$
where $\ \rho_\mathsf{e}\$ is the free electron density (the number of free electrons per unit volume). For the case of a metal, one can prove that this equation remains approximately true for temperatures lower than the Fermi temperature, about 10^{6} kelvins.

When particle energies reach relativistic levels, a modified formula is required. The relativistic degeneracy pressure is proportional to $\ \rho_\mathsf{e}^{\tfrac{4}{3}} ~.$

== Examples ==
=== Metals ===
For the case of electrons in crystalline solid, several approximations are carefully justified to treat the electrons as independent particles. Usual models are the free electron model and the nearly free electron model. In the appropriate systems, the free electron pressure can be calculated; it can be shown that this pressure is an important contributor to the compressibility or bulk modulus of metals.

=== White dwarfs ===
Electron degeneracy pressure will halt the gravitational collapse of a star if its mass is below the Chandrasekhar limit (1.44 solar masses). This is the pressure that prevents a white dwarf star from collapsing. A star exceeding this limit and without significant thermally generated pressure will continue to collapse to form either a neutron star or a black hole, because the degeneracy pressure provided by the electrons is weaker than the inward pull of gravity.

== See also ==
- Exchange interaction – Quantum mechanical effect
- Fermi level – Quantity in solid state thermodynamics
- Bose–Einstein condensate – State of matter
- Nuclear density – Density of the nucleus of an atom
