= PSR J0348+0432 =

Pulsar–white dwarf binary system in Taurus constellation

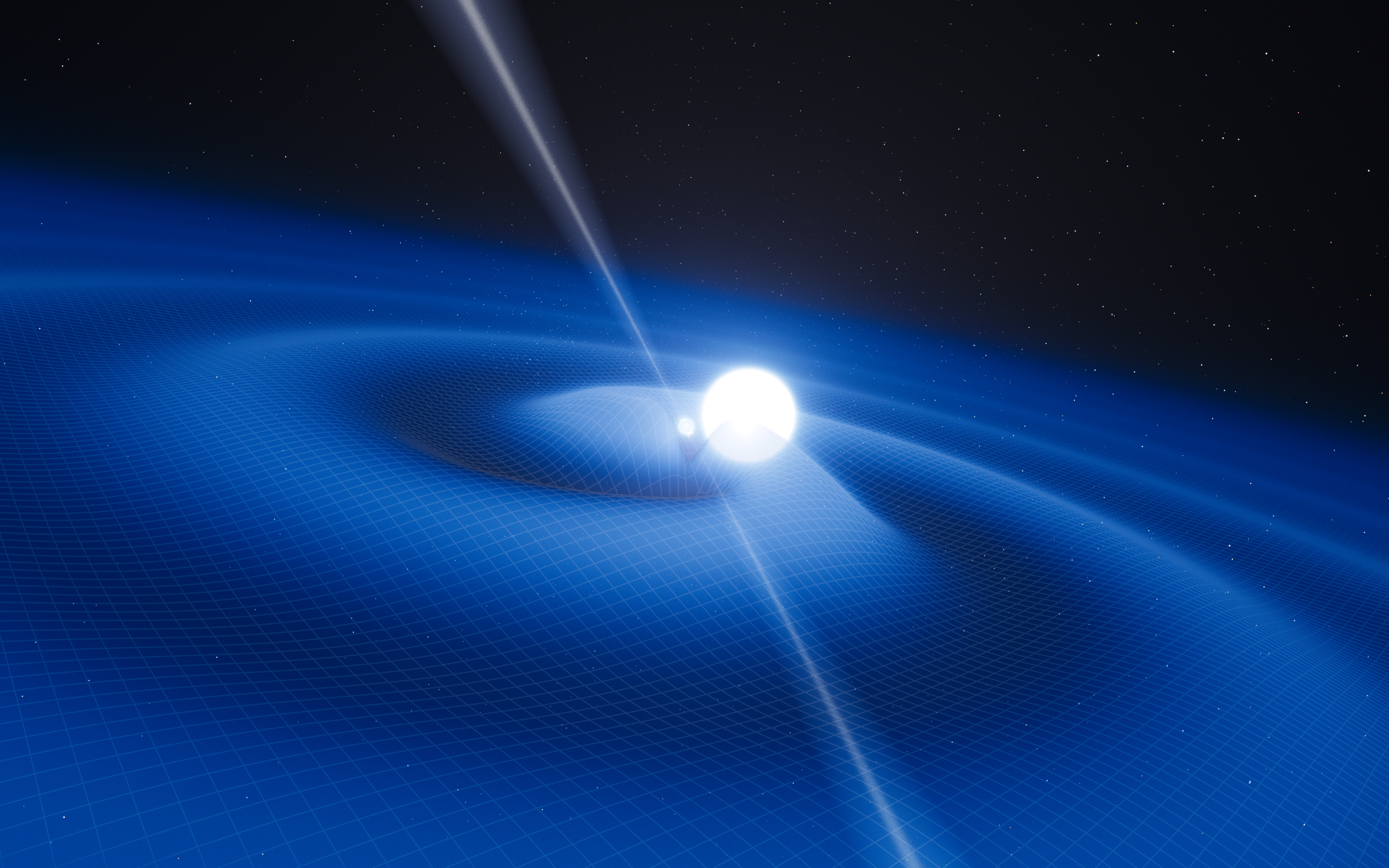
- Artist's impression of the pulsar PSR J0348+0432 and its white dwarf companion

Observation data Epoch J2000 Equinox ICRS
- Constellation: Taurus
- Right ascension: 03^{h} 48^{m} 43.639^{s}
- Declination: +04° 32′ 11.46″

Characteristics
- Spectral type: Pulsar

Astrometry
Radial velocity (R_{v})	−1±20 km/s
Proper motion (μ)	RA: +4.04 mas/yr Dec.: +3.5 mas/yr
Parallax (π)	0.47 mas
Distance	6,800 ly (2,100 pc)

Orbit
Primary	PSR J0348+0432
Name	White dwarf
Period (P)	0.102424062722(7) days
Semi-major axis (a)	832,000 km
Inclination (i)	40.2(6)°

Details

Pulsar
Mass	2.01 M_{☉}
Radius	13±2 km, 1.87(29)×10^{−5} R_{☉}
Rotation	39.1226563571297 ms
Age	2.6×10^{9} years

White dwarf
Mass	0.172 M_{☉}
Radius	0.065(5) R_{☉}

Database references
SIMBAD	data

PSR J0348+0432 is a pulsar–white dwarf binary system in the constellation Taurus. It was discovered in 2007 with the National Radio Astronomy Observatory's Robert C. Byrd Green Bank Telescope in a drift-scan survey.

In 2013, a mass measurement for this neutron star was announced: slightly over two times the mass of the Sun (2.01±0.04 M_{☉}). This measurement was done with a combination of radio timing and precise spectroscopy of the white dwarf companion. This is slightly higher than, but statistically indistinguishable from, the mass of PSR J1614−2230, which was measured using the Shapiro delay. This measurement confirmed the existence of such massive neutron stars using a different measuring technique.

The notable feature of this binary pulsar is its combination of high neutron-star mass and short orbital period: 2 hours and 27 minutes. This allowed a measurement of the orbital decay due to the emission of gravitational waves, as observed for PSR B1913+16 and PSR J0737−3039.

== Background ==
The first radio pulsar was discovered in 1967 by Jocelyn Bell and her adviser, Antony Hewish using the Interplanetary Scintillation Array. Franco Pacini and Thomas Gold quickly put forth the idea that pulsars are highly magnetized rotating neutron stars, which form as a result of a supernova at the end of the life of stars more massive than about 10 times the mass of the Sun. The radiation emitted by pulsars is caused by interaction of the plasma surrounding the neutron star with its rapidly rotating magnetic field. This interaction leads to emission "in the pattern of a rotating beacon", as emission escapes along the magnetic poles of the neutron star. The "rotating beacon" property of pulsars arises from the misalignment of their magnetic poles with their rotational poles. Historically, pulsars have been discovered at radio wavelengths where emission is strong, but space telescopes that operate in the gamma ray wavelengths have also discovered pulsars.

== Observations ==
In 2007, the Green Bank Telescope underwent track repair, and was unable to track for several months. An international team of astronomers was nevertheless able to record the data from the antenna, letting the Earth do the job of moving the beam of the telescope across the sky, a process known as a drift scan survey. They found a total of 35 new pulsars, including 7 new millisecond pulsars and PSR J0348+0432.

In 2011 the white dwarf companion to the pulsar was observed with the FORS2 spectrograph of the European Southern Observatory's Very Large Telescope, in Chile. These data were combined with radio observations to determine the mass of the white dwarf and the pulsar. Radio timing of the pulsar with the 305-metre radio telescope at the Arecibo Observatory and the Effelsberg 100-metre Radio Telescope soon also detected the orbital decay of the system due to the emission of gravitational waves. This matched the rate predicted by general relativity.

== Significance ==
The combination of a large neutron-star mass, low white-dwarf mass (mass ratio ~ 1:11.7) and short orbital period (2 hours and 27 minutes) allows astronomers to test general relativity in a regime of extreme gravitational fields, where it had never been tested before. The result also has implications for the direct detection of gravitational waves and for understanding of stellar evolution. The measured mass of 2.01±0.04 M_{☉} puts an empirical lower bound on the value of the Tolman–Oppenheimer–Volkoff limit.

PSR J0348+0432 is also a candidate for a hyperon star, a massive neutron star containing hyperons.
