= Nuclear density =

Density of the nucleus of an atom

Nuclear density is the density of the nucleons (neutrons and protons) in the nucleus. For heavy nuclei, it is close to the nuclear saturation density $n_0=0.15\pm0.01$ nucleons/fm^{3}, which minimizes the energy density of an infinite nuclear matter. The nuclear saturation mass density is thus $\rho_0=n_0 m_{\rm u} \approx 2.5\times10^{17}$ kg/m^{3}, where m_{u} is the atomic mass constant. The descriptive term nuclear density is also applied to situations where similarly high densities occur, such as within neutron stars.

== Evaluation ==
The nuclear density of a typical nucleus can be approximately calculated from the size of the nucleus, which itself can be approximated based on the number of protons and neutrons in it. The radius of a typical nucleus, in terms of number of nucleons, is $R=A^{1/3}R_0$ where $A$ is the mass number and $R_0$ is 1.25 fm, with typical deviations of up to 0.2 fm from this value. The number density of the nucleus is thus:

$$n = \frac{A}{{4\over 3} \pi R^3}$$

The density for any typical nucleus, in terms of mass number, is thus constant, not dependent on A or R, theoretically:

$$n_0^\mathrm{theor} = \frac{A}{{4\over 3} \pi (A^{1/3}R_0)^3} = \frac{3}{4 \pi (1.25\ \mathrm{fm})^3} = 0.122 \ \mathrm{fm}^{-3} = 1.22 \times 10^{44} \ \mathrm{m}^{-3}$$

The experimentally determined value for the nuclear saturation density is

$$n_0^\mathrm{exp}=0.15\pm0.01\ \mathrm{fm}^{-3} = (1.5\pm 0.1)\times 10^{44}\ \mathrm{m}^{-3}.$$

The mass density ρ is the product of the number density n by the particle's mass. The calculated mass density, using a nucleon mass of m_{n}=1.67×10^{−27} kg, is thus:

$\rho_0^\mathrm{theor}=m_\mathrm{n}\,n_0^\mathrm{theor} \approx 2 \times 10^{17} \ \mathrm{kg} \ \mathrm{m}^{-3}$ (using the theoretical estimate)

or

$\rho_0^\mathrm{exp}=m_\mathrm{n}\,n_0^\mathrm{exp} \approx 2.5 \times 10^{17} \ \mathrm{kg} \ \mathrm{m}^{-3}$ (using the experimental value).

== Applications and extensions ==
The components of an atom and of a nucleus have varying densities. The proton is not a fundamental particle, being composed of quark–gluon matter. Its size is approximately 10^{−15} meters and its density 10^{18} kg/m^{3}. The descriptive term nuclear density is also applied to situations where similarly high densities occur, such as within neutron stars.

Using deep inelastic scattering, it has been estimated that the "size" of an electron, if it is not a point particle, must be less than 10^{−17} meters. This would correspond to a density of roughly 10^{21} kg/m^{3}.

There are possibilities for still-higher densities when it comes to quark matter. In the near future, the highest experimentally measurable densities will likely be limited to leptons and quarks.

== See also ==
- Electron degeneracy pressure – Repulsive force in quantum mechanics
- Nuclear matter – System of interacting nucleons
- Quark–gluon plasma – State of matter important in cosmology and particle physics
