= Franco Pacini =

Italian astrophysicist

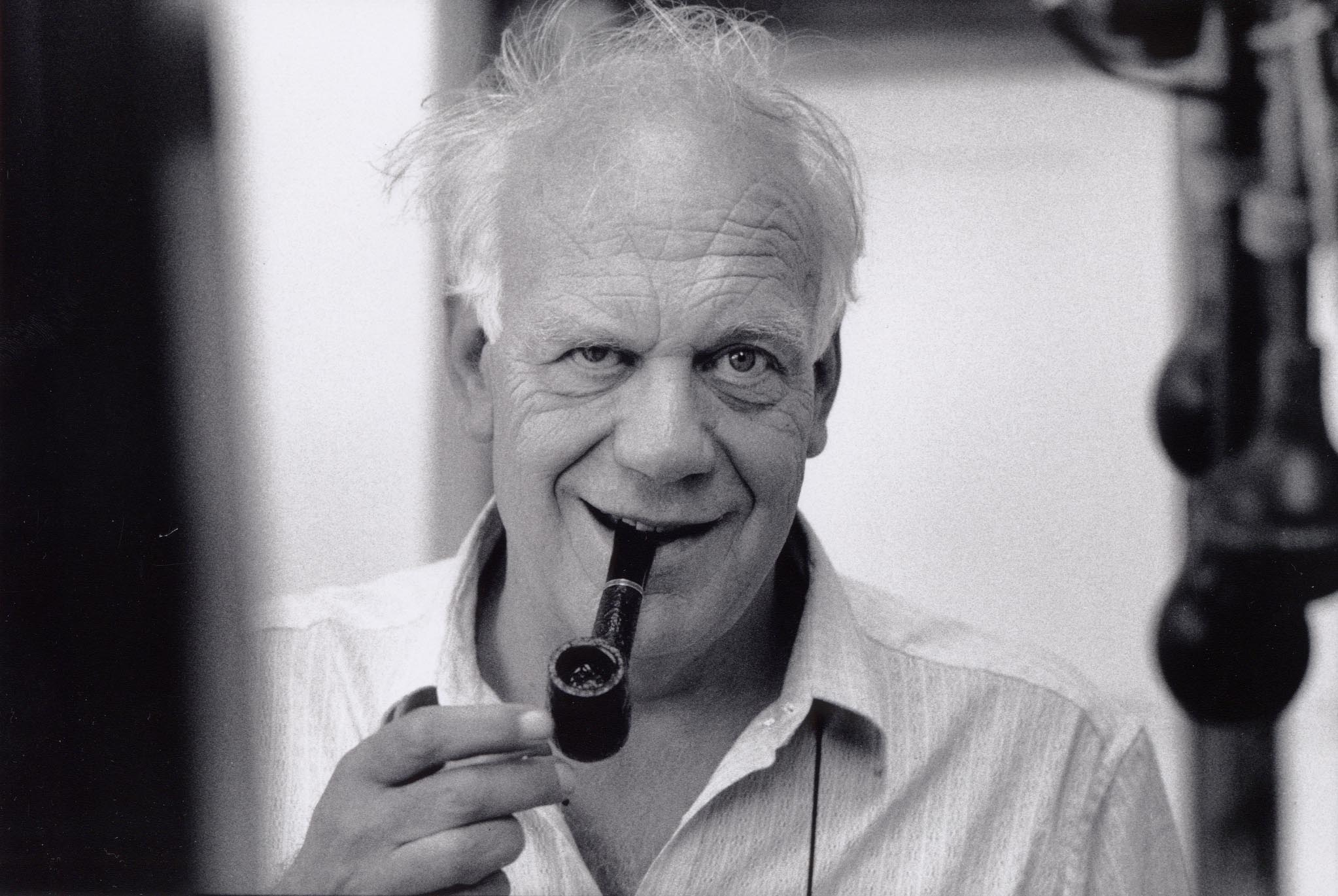
- Born: 10 May 1939; Florence, Italy
- Died: 26 January 2012 (aged 72); Florence, Italy
- Citizenship: Italian
- Known for: pulsar, neutron stars
- Awards: Prize of the Italian Government for Science (1997)
- Scientific career
- Fields: Astrophysics
- Workplaces: University of Florence; Arcetri Observatory

Franco Pacini (10 May 1939 – 26 January 2012) was an Italian astrophysicist and professor at the University of Florence. He carried out research, mostly in High Energy Astrophysics, in Italy, France, United States and at the European Southern Observatory.

== Biography ==
Pacini was born in Florence on 10 May 1939, however he moved early on to Urbino. His parents were Gualtiero Pacini, a teacher from Urbino and Elsa Roesch, born in Baden, Switzerland. Pacini was married in 1966 to Rosemary Winterer, a teacher, born in St. Louis, Missouri. They had three children: Giulia, Tommaso and Giorgio.

Pacini graduated from a local high school, Raffaello, in Urbino. He studied physics at the Scuola Normale Superiore in Pisa and later at the Sapienza in Rome, where he graduated in 1964. Pacini's thesis (Livio Gratton was his advisor) was about neutron stars, which were hypothetical objects at the time. Pacini continued to work on neutron stars at Institut d'astrophysique de Paris, where he was a post-doctoral fellow.

Pacini continued his research on neutron stars at the Institute d'Astrophysique in Paris. From 1967 to 1973, he was research associate and visiting professor at Cornell University. In 1967 he published in Nature the first specific suggestion that strongly magnetized neutron stars could release their rotational energy and produce a large flow of relativistic particles. The discovery of pulsars in Cambridge (UK) proved the correctness of his hypothesis a few months later by Jocelyn Bell Burnell and Antony Hewish of University of Cambridge. In 1968 in another Nature article, Pacini wrote that at the center of the Crab Nebula would be found a pulsar, which would explain the emission of electromagnetic radiation.

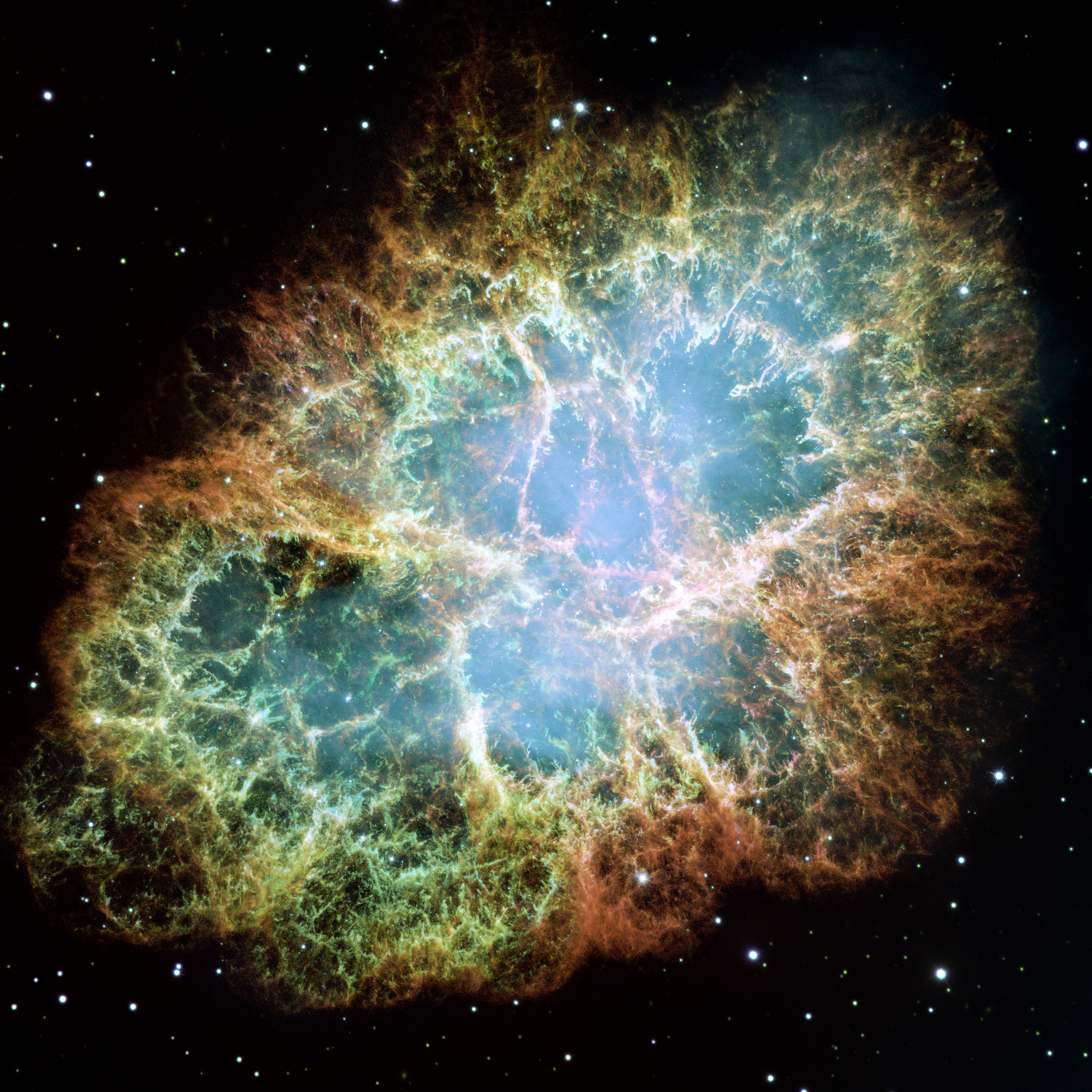
Crab Nebula

The discovery of the strong infrared emission from some starburst galaxies, Pacini, together with Martin Harwit, suggested that these sources are related to an evolutionary stage of a galaxy during which massive stars are being formed, a scenario which is now generally accepted.

In 1975 Pacini joined the newly created scientific group of the European Southern Observatory in Geneva; Pacini served as President from 1975 to 1978. He was instrumental also for Italy to enter into the ESO. On returning to Italy in 1978, he became Director of the Arcetri Astrophysical Observatory in Florence and a professor at the University of Florence. He held this post until 2001. During his tenure the Observatory greatly expanded its scientific activity in different areas, in a broad context of international collaborations. In particular, during this period the Arcetri Observatory became partner in the construction of the Large Binocular Telescope (LBT).

In 1982 Pacini was one of the 69 signatories signing a petition circulated by Carl Sagan: Extraterrestrial Intelligence: An International Petition.

Pacini had an ability to use humorous images when talking about science, as can be read in article by Virginia Trimble and Markus Aschwanden: What is in the jets? Franco Pacini is supposed to have said that relativistic tomatoes would do.

He was member of a large number of international boards and committees. He was President of the International Astronomical Union for a three-year period (2001–03). He was Member of the Accademia Nazionale dei Lincei, Associate Member of the Royal Astronomical Society and Member of the American Astronomical Society. At the 25th General Assembly of the IAU, held in Sydney in 2003, he proposed to designate 2009 the International Year of Astronomy as a way to celebrate the 400th anniversary of Galileo's first telescopic observations.

Asteroid 25601 Francopacini is named after him. In 1997 he received the Prize of the Italian Government for Science.

Over the years he carried out a wide range of activities aimed at communicating science to the general public, including children and adults, with frequent public lectures, popular articles in newspapers, books and appearances on television. Pacini was involved in starting Children's Day at Arcetri Observatory. He also wrote five children's books.

== Children's books ==
Pacini wrote five children’s books with Lara Albanese:

- Verso le galassie lontane
- Il nostro amico E.T.
- In giro fra le stelle
- Visitiamo i pianeti
- Viaggio nell'universo: Verso le lontane galassie-In giro fra le stelle-Visitiamo i pianeti-Il nostro amico E.T.

== Books ==
- High Energy Phenomena Around Collapsed Stars, Editor: Franco Pacini

== Articles ==
- The supermassive black hole in Centaurus A: a benchmark for gas kinematical measurements; Franco Pacini, D. J. Axon, A. Capetti, D. Macchetto, A. M. Koekemoer, E. J. Schreier; Astronomy and Astrophysics; 12 November 2005:
- The Relationship Between Supernova Remnants and Neutron Stars; Franco Pacini; ESO Astrophysics Symposia; 2003-09-22:
- Neutron Stars, Pulsars and Supernova Remnants: concluding remarks; Franco Pacini; Physikzentrum Bad Honnef; 2002-08-30: arXiv:astro-ph/0208563
- Precursor Plerionic Activity and High Energy Gamma-Ray Emission in the Supranova Model of Gamma-Ray Bursts; Susumu Inoue, Dafne Guetta, Franco Pacini; The Astrophysical Journal; 25 September 2002:
- Inhomogeneous models for plerions: the surface brightness profile of the Crab Nebula; E. Amato, M. Salvati, R. Bandiera, Franco Pacini, L. Woltjer; Astronomy and Astrophysics; 2000-05-23: arXiv:astro-ph/9911163

1987A

- Neutron Stars in Supernova Remnants, 1999; Franco Pacini; ASP Conference Series, Vol. 195; 1999-11-22:
- High Observed Brightnesses in Radio Jets; M. Spada, M. Salvati, Franco Pacini; The Astrophysical Journal; 1998-08-20: arXiv:astro-ph/9808207
- Rapid Variability of Gamma-Ray Blazars: A Model for MKN 421, 1998; M. Spada, M. Salvati, Franco Pacini; The Astrophysical Journal Letters; 1998-01-07: arXiv:astro-ph/9801049
- The Supernova Remnant G11.2-0.3 and its central Pulsar; R. Bandiera, M. Salvati, Franco Pacini; The Astrophysical Journal; 1996-04-16: arXiv:astro-ph/9801049
- Electromagnetic activity of white dwarfs, 1970; Franco Pacini; Memorie della Società Astronomia Italiana, Vol. 41; 1970-01-01:
- X-rays from supernova 1987A - Beneath the radioactive layers, 1989; Rino Bandiera, Franco Pacini, Marco Salvati; Astrophysical Journal, Part 1; 1989-09-15:
- Optical and X-ray radiation from fast pulsars - Effects of duty cycle and spectral shape, 1987; Franco Pacini, M. Salvati; Astrophysical Journal, Part 1 vol. 321; 1987-10-01:
- Possible manifestations of a neutron star inside SN 1987A, 1987; Franco Pacini; ESO Workshop on the SN 1987A; 1987-07-06:
- The evolution of nonthermal supernova remnants. II - Can radio supernovae become plerions?, 1984; R. Bandiera, Franco Pacini, M. Salvati; Astrophysical Journal, Part 1, vol. 285; 1984-10-01:
- Infrared galaxies - Evolutionary stages of massive star formation, 1975; M. Harwit, Franco Pacini; Astrophysical Journal, vol. 200; 1975-09-15:
- Possible models for some transient X-ray sources, 1975; Stuart L. Shapiro, Franco Pacini; Nature; 1975-10-01:
- Rotation in High-Energy Astrophysics, 1973; Franco Pacini, Martin J. Rees; Scientific American Vol. 228, No. 2 |; 1973-02-01:
- On the Evolution of Supernova Remnants. Evolution of the Magnetic Field, Particles, Content, and Luminosity, 1973; Franco Pacini, M. Salvati; Astrophysical Journal, Vol. 186, pp. 249–26; 1973-01-01:
- On the Mechanism of the Glitches in the Crab Nebula Pulsar, 1971; Jeffrey D. Scargle, Franco Pacini; Nature Physical Science: 1971-07-30;
- A model for the radiations from the compact strong sources CSR-TR-70-5,1970; A. Cavaliere, P. Morrison, Franco Pacini; Center for Space Research, M.I.T.; 1970-01-01:
- Can the Observed Microwave Background be due to a Superposition of Sources?; Thomas Gold, Franco Pacini; Astrophysical Journal, vol. 152, p. L115; 1968-05-01:
- Equilibrium for neutron stars, 1965; Franco Pacini; Memorie della Società Astronomia Italiana, Vol. 36, p. 323; 1965-09-01:

== Activities ==
- Postdoc-fellow, 1965-1966; Institut d'astrophysique de Paris, Paris, France
- Researcher / visiting professor, 1966-1968; 1969-1975; Cornell University, Ithaca (New York), United States of America
- Researcher / staff member, 1968-1975; Institute of Space Astrophysics (CNR), Frascati (Rome), Italy

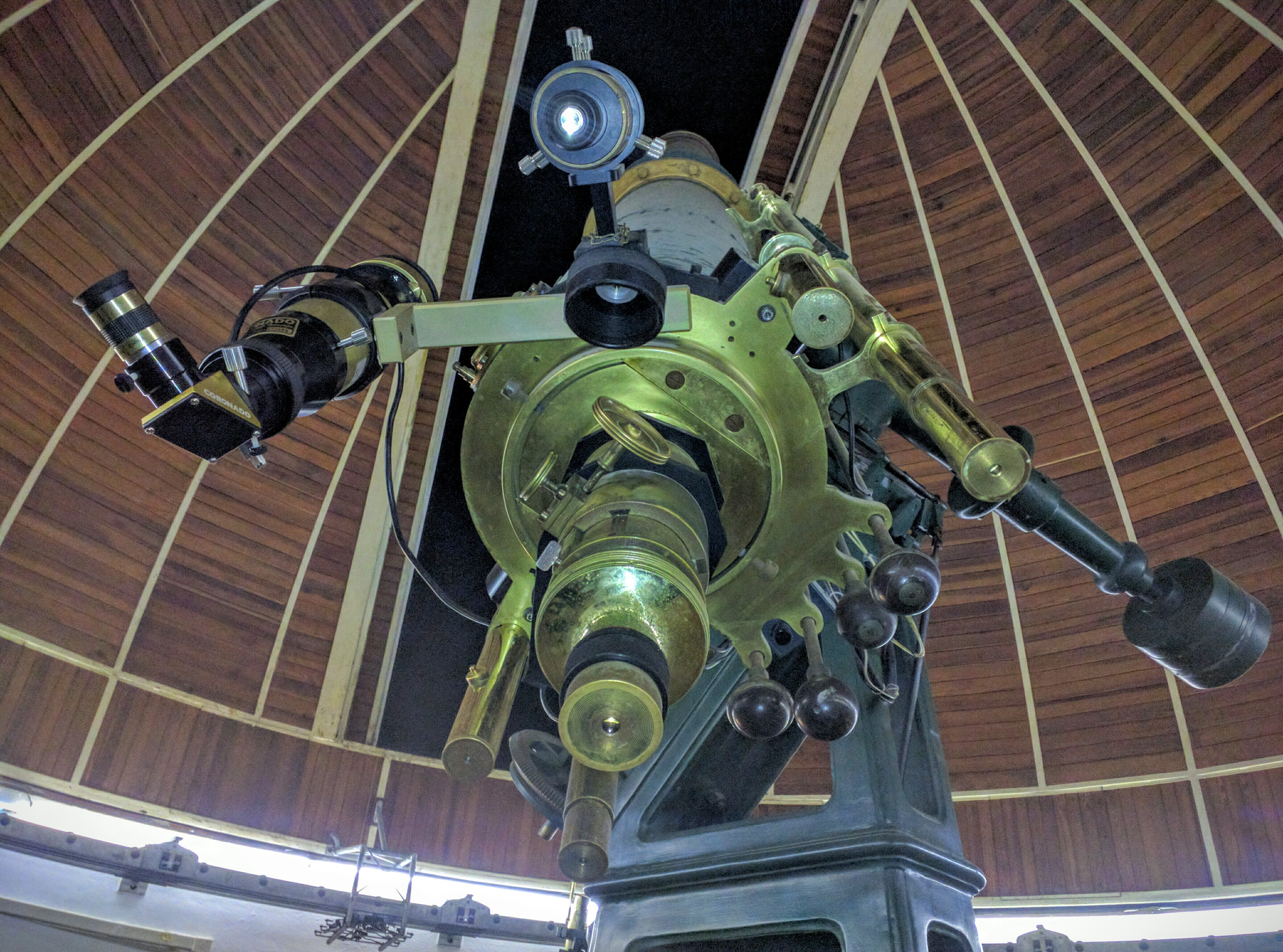
Arcetri, telescopio

- Head of scientific division, 1975-1978; European southern observatory, Geneva, Switzerland
- Ordinary professor, 1978-2009; University of Florence, Italy
- Director, 1978-2001; Arcetri Observatory (Osservatorio Astrofisico di Arcetri), Arcetri, Florence, Italy
- Corresponding member of the physical, mathematical and natural sciences class, Tuscany academy of sciences and letters La Colombaria, 1983; Florence, Italy
- Corresponding member in the class of physical and mathematical sciences, Accademia de 'Lincei, 1985-2012; Rome, Italy
- Scientific committee member, 1989; Italian Space Agency, Rome, Italy
- President, 2001-2003; International Astronomical Union
- Member governing council, 2000-2004; National institute of astrophysics, Rome, Italy

== Honours and awards ==
- Member of the Accademia nazionale dei lincei, Lacchini Award (1999)
- Borgia Prize of the Accademia nazionale dei lincei
- Associate Member of the Royal astronomical society
- Member of the American astronomical society
- Honorary member of the Royal astronomical society
- Prize of the Italian government for science (1997)
- Commendatore of the Order of merit of the Italian Republic (2001)
- Honorary Citizen of Urbino (2002)
- Fiorino d'Oro award of the City of Florence (2002)
- Asteroid 25601 Francopacini is named after Franco Pacini

== Past affiliations within the International Astronomical Union ==
- Past President of commission 48 high-energy astrophysics (1979-1982)
- Past President of executive committee (2000-2003)
- Past President elect of executive committee (1997-2000)
- Past Vice-president of commission 48 high-energy astrophysics (1976-1979)
- Past Vice-president of executive committee (1991-1997)
- Past Chair of special nominating committee (2000-2003)
- Past Organizing committee member of commission 48 high-energy astrophysics (1970-1994)
- Past Organizing committee member of Commission 51 bio-astronomy (1982-1991)
- Past Advisor of executive committee (2003-2006)
- Past Member of division III planetary systems sciences
- Past Member of division XI space & high energy astrophysics
- Past Member of commission 44 space & high energy astrophysics
- Past Member of commission 48 high-energy astrophysics
- Past Member of commission 51 bio-astronomy
- Past Member of special nominating committee (1985-1988), (2003-2006)
