= Five College Radio Astronomy Observatory =

Observatory in Massachusetts, US

- FCRAO Radome-enclosed 14-m Telescope, on the Prescott Peninsula in the Quabbin Reservoir. Circa 1977.
- Organization: Five College Consortium
- Location: Massachusetts
- Coordinates: 42°23′31″N 72°20′39″W
- Altitude: 306 m (1,004 ft)
- Established: 1969
- Closed: 2011
- Website: www.astro.umass.edu/~fcrao/

The Five College Radio Astronomical Observatory (FCRAO) was a radio astronomy observatory located on a peninsula in the Quabbin Reservoir. It was sited in the town of New Salem, Massachusetts on land that was originally part of Prescott, Massachusetts. It was founded in 1969 by the Five College Astronomy Department (University of Massachusetts Amherst (UMass), Amherst College, Hampshire College, Mount Holyoke College and Smith College). From its inception, the observatory has emphasized research, the development of technology and the training of students—both graduate and undergraduate.

The initial FCRAO telescope was a customized low-frequency antenna to search for pulsars in the galaxy. The development of instrumentation within the FCRAO labs contributed to the discovery of the binary pulsar system PSR B1913+16 by Joseph Taylor and Russell Hulse, for which they received the 1993 Nobel Prize in Physics. It was replaced by a 14-meter radome-enclosed millimeter-wave telescope in 1976.

== Decommissioning ==
After UMass Amherst devoted its time, energy, and funding to the Large Millimeter Telescope (LMT) in Mexico from approximately 2005, FCRAO was described as being the then–"current platform", with the LMT referred to as its "future platform". On July 21, 2011, the Massachusetts Water Resources Authority announced that the telescope and the associated control building were removed from the site.

== See also ==
- List of astronomical observatories
- List of radio telescopes
