= PSR J0737−3039 =

Double pulsar in the constellation Puppis

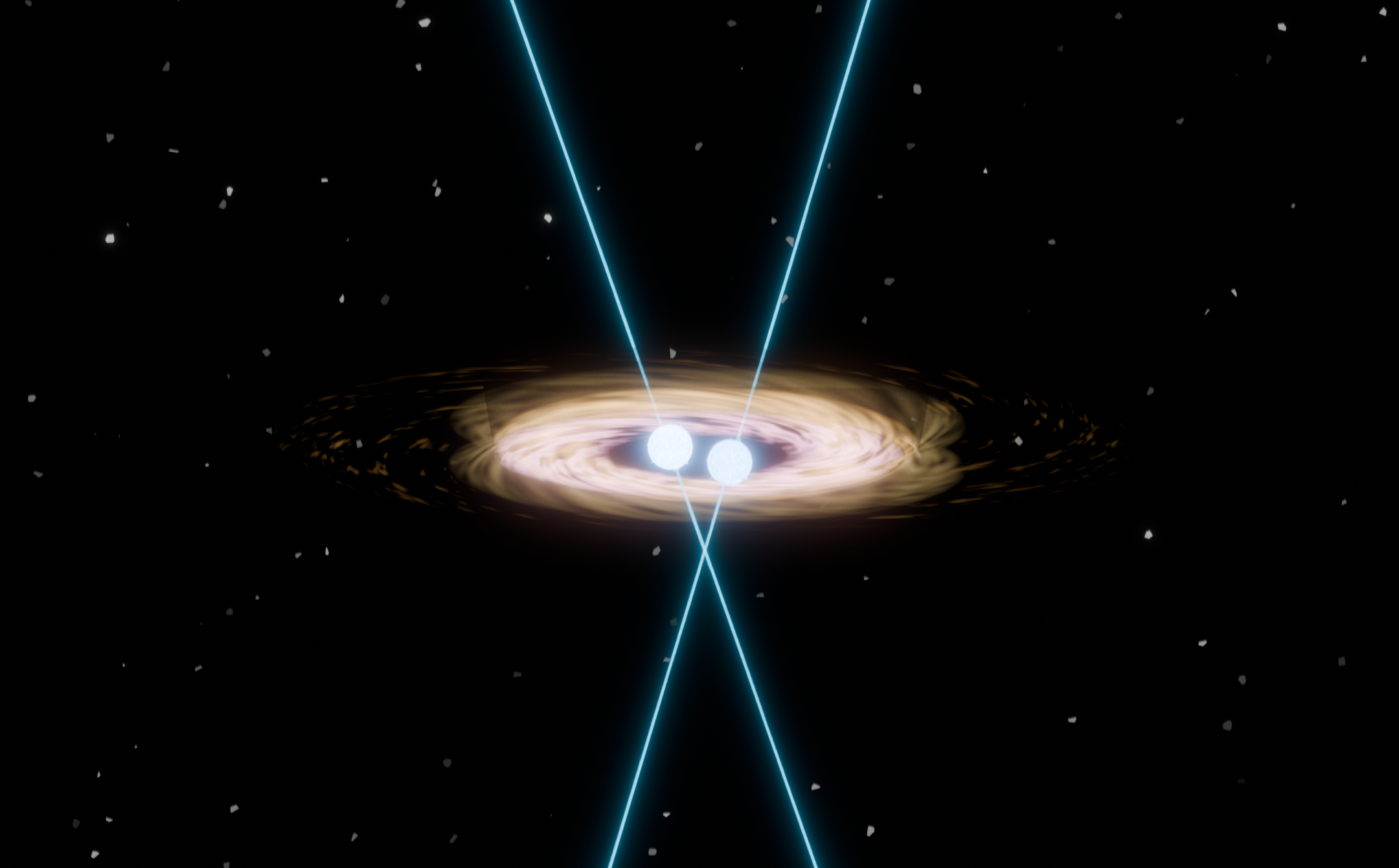
- Artist's impression. The objects are not shown to scale. Theoretically, Earth is aligned with one of the beams.

Observation data Epoch J2000 Equinox ICRS
- Constellation: Puppis
- Right ascension: 07^{h} 37^{m} 51.248^{s}
- Declination: −30° 39′ 40.83″

Characteristics
- Spectral type: Pulsar

Astrometry
Distance	3,750 ly (1,150 pc)

Orbit
Primary	PSR J0737−3039 A
Secondary	PSR J0737−3039 B
Period (P)	2.45 h
Eccentricity (e)	0.088

Details

PSR J0737−3039A
Mass	1.3381±0.0007 M_{☉}
Rotation	22.69937984168 ms
Age	204 Myr

PSR J0737−3039B
Mass	1.2489±0.0007 M_{☉}
Rotation	2.7734613996 s
Age	49.2 Myr

Other designations
- 2XMM J073751.4−303940

Database references
SIMBAD	data

PSR J0737−3039 is the first-known double pulsar. It consists of two neutron stars emitting electromagnetic waves in the radio wavelength in a relativistic binary system. The two pulsars are known as PSR J0737−3039A and PSR J0737−3039B. It was discovered in 2003 at Australia's Parkes Observatory by an international team led by the Italian radio astronomer Marta Burgay during a high-latitude pulsar survey.

== Pulsars ==
A pulsar is a neutron star which produces pulsating radio emission due to a strong magnetic field. A neutron star is the ultra-compact remnant of a massive star which exploded as a supernova. Neutron stars have a mass bigger than the Sun, yet are only a few kilometers across. These extremely dense objects rotate on their axes, producing focused electromagnetic waves which sweep around the sky and briefly point toward Earth in a lighthouse effect at rates that can reach a few hundred pulses per second.

Although double-neutron star systems were known before its discovery, PSR J0737−3039 is the first and only known system (as of 2021) where both neutron stars are pulsars—hence, a "double pulsar" system. The object is similar to PSR B1913+16, which was discovered in 1974 by Taylor and Hulse, and for which the two won the 1993 Nobel Prize in Physics. Objects of this kind enable precise testing of Einstein's theory of general relativity, because the precise and consistent timing of the pulsar pulses allows relativistic effects to be seen when they would otherwise be too small. While many known pulsars have a binary companion, and many of those are believed to be neutron stars, J0737−3039 is the first case where both components are known to be not just neutron stars but pulsars.

=== Discovery ===
PSR J0737−3039A was discovered in 2003, along with its partner, at Australia's 64 m antenna of the Parkes Radio Observatory; J0737−3039B was not identified as a pulsar until a second observation. The system was originally observed by an international team during a high-latitude multibeam survey organized in order to discover more pulsars in the night sky.

Initially, this star system was thought to be an ordinary pulsar detection. The first detection showed one pulsar with a period of 22.699 milliseconds in orbit around a neutron star. Only after follow-up observations was a weaker second pulsar detected with a pulse of 2.7734 seconds from the companion star.

== Physical characteristics ==
The orbital period of J0737−3039 (2.45 hours) is one of the shortest known for such an object (one-third that of the Taylor–Hulse binary), which enables the most precise tests yet. In 2005, it was announced that measurements had shown an excellent agreement between general relativity theory and observation. In particular, the predictions for energy loss due to gravitational waves appear to match the theory.

As a result of energy loss due to gravitational waves, the common orbit (roughly 800,000 kilometers [500,000 miles] in diameter) shrinks by 7 mm per day. The two components will coalesce in about 85 million years.

Property	Pulsar A	Pulsar B
Spin period	22.699 milliseconds	2.7734 seconds
Mass	1.338 solar masses	1.249 solar masses
Characteristic age	204 million years old	49.2 million years old
Orbital period	2.454 hours (8,834.53499 seconds)	

Due to relativistic spin precession, the pulses from Pulsar B are no longer detectable as of March 2008 but are expected to reappear in 2035 due to precession back into view.

== Use as a test of general relativity ==
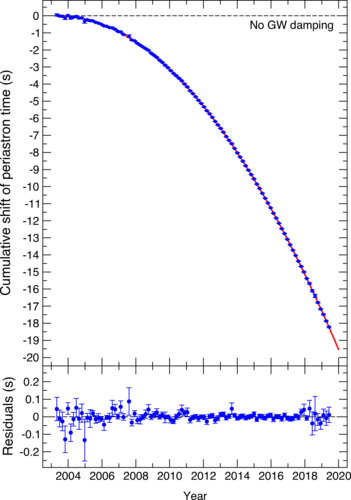
Cumulative shift in the periastron period

Observations of 16 years of timing data have been reported in 2021 to be on agreement with general relativity by studying the loss of orbital energy due to gravitational waves. The orbital decay and the speedup of the orbital period was tested to follow the quadrupole formula with a great precision of 0.013% mainly because of the unique characteristics of the system which has two pulsars, is nearby and possesses an inclination close to 90°.

=== Unique origin ===
In addition to the importance of this system to tests of general relativity, Piran and Shaviv have shown that the young pulsar in this system must have been born with no mass ejection, implying a new process of neutron star formation that does not involve a supernova. Whereas the standard supernova model predicts that the system will have a proper motion of more than hundred km/s, they predicted that this system would not show any significant proper motion. Their prediction was later confirmed by pulsar timing.

=== Eclipses ===
Another discovery from the double pulsar is the observation of an eclipse from a conjunction of the superior and weaker pulsar. This happens when the doughnut-shaped magnetosphere of one pulsar, which is filled with absorbing plasma, blocks the companion pulsar's light. The blockage, lasting more than 30 s, is not complete, due to the orientation of the plane of rotation of the binary system relative to Earth and the limited size of the weaker pulsar's magnetosphere; some of the stronger pulsar's light can still be detected during the eclipse.

== Other binary systems ==
In addition to a double pulsar system, a whole range of differing two-body systems are known where only one member of the system is a pulsar. Known examples are variations on a binary star:

A pulsar–white dwarf system; e.g., PSR B1620−26
A pulsar–neutron star system, e.g., PSR B1913+16
A pulsar and a normal star; e.g., PSR J0045−7319, a system that is composed of a pulsar and main-sequence B star.

Theoretically, a pulsar-black hole system is possible and would be of enormous scientific interest but no such system has yet been identified. A pulsar has recently been detected very near the super-massive black hole at the core of our galaxy, but its motion has not yet been officially confirmed as a capture orbit of Sgr A*. A pulsar–black hole system could be an even stronger test of Einstein's theory of general relativity, due to the immense gravitational forces exerted by both celestial objects.

Also of great scientific interest is PSR J0337+1715, a pulsar-white dwarf binary system that has a third white dwarf star in a more distant orbit circling around both of the other two. This unique arrangement is being used to explore the strong equivalence principle of physics, a fundamental assumption upon which all of general relativity rests. It also has a potential exoplanet orbiting all three at once.

The Square Kilometre Array, a radio telescope due to be completed in the late 2020s, will both further observe known and detect new binary pulsar systems in order to test general relativity.

== See also ==
- Radio astronomy
