= Binary pulsar =

Two pulsars orbiting each other

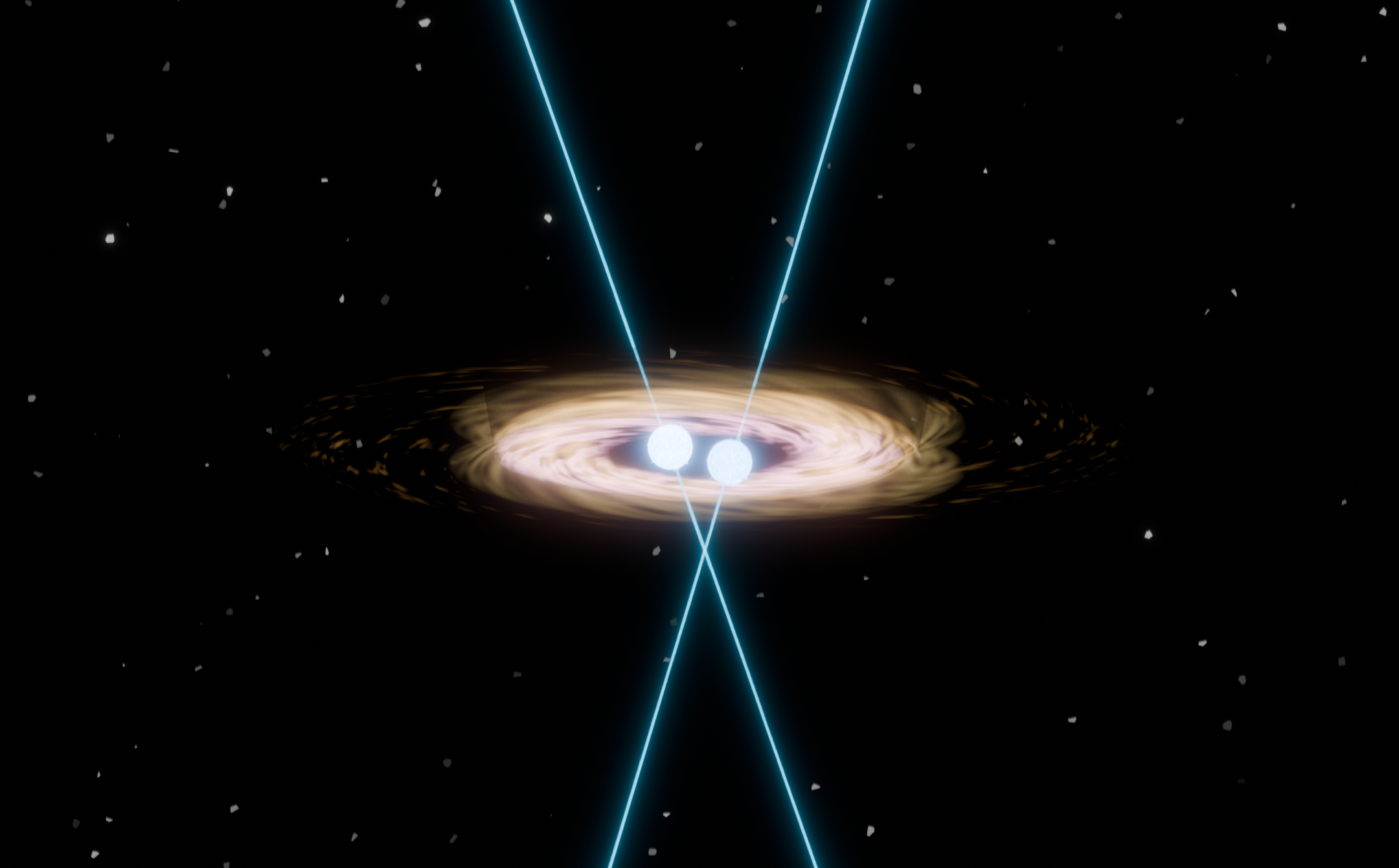
Artist's impression of a binary pulsar

A binary pulsar is a pulsar with a binary companion, often a white dwarf or neutron star. (In at least one case, the double pulsar PSR J0737-3039, the companion neutron star is another pulsar as well.) Binary pulsars are one of the few objects which allow physicists to test general relativity because of the strong gravitational fields in their vicinities. Although the binary companion to the pulsar is usually difficult or impossible to observe directly, its presence can be deduced from the timing of the pulses from the pulsar itself, which can be measured with extraordinary accuracy by radio telescopes.

== History ==
The binary pulsar PSR B1913+16 (or the "Hulse-Taylor binary pulsar") was first discovered in 1974 at Arecibo by Joseph Hooton Taylor, Jr. and Russell Hulse, for which they won the 1993 Nobel Prize in Physics. While Hulse was observing the newly discovered pulsar PSR B1913+16, he noticed that the rate at which it pulsed varied regularly. It was concluded that the pulsar was orbiting another star very closely at a high velocity, and that the pulse period was varying due to the Doppler effect: As the pulsar was moving towards Earth, the pulses would be more frequent; and conversely, as it moved away from Earth fewer would be detected in a given time period. One can think of the pulses like the ticks of a clock; changes in the ticking are indications of changes in the pulsars speed toward and away from Earth. Hulse and Taylor also determined that the stars were approximately equally massive by observing these pulse fluctuations, which led them to believe the other object was also a neutron star. Pulses from this system are now tracked to within 15 μs. (Note: Cen X-3 was actually the first "binary pulsar" discovered in 1971, followed by Her X-1 in 1972.)

The study of the PSR B1913+16 binary pulsar also led to the first accurate determination of neutron star masses, using relativistic timing effects. When the two bodies are in close proximity, the gravitational field is stronger, the passage of time is slowed – and the time between pulses (or ticks) is lengthened. Then as the pulsar clock travels more slowly through the weakest part of the field it regains time. A special relativistic effect, time dilation, acts around the orbit in a similar fashion. This relativistic time delay is the difference between what one would expect to see if the pulsar were moving at a constant distance and speed around its companion in a circular orbit, and what is actually observed.

M1-M2 plot of double pulsar data showing agreement with General Relativity

Prior to the first observation of gravitational waves in 2015 and the operation of Advanced LIGO, binary pulsars were the only tools scientists had to detect evidence of gravitational waves; Einstein's theory of general relativity predicts that two neutron stars would emit gravitational waves as they orbit a common center of mass, which would carry away orbital energy and cause the two stars to draw closer together and shorten their orbital period. A 10-parameter model incorporating information about the pulsar timing, the Keplerian orbits and three post-Keplerian corrections (the rate of periastron advance, a factor for gravitational redshift and time dilation, and a rate of change of the orbital period from gravitational radiation emission) is sufficient to completely model the binary pulsar timing.. This test of GR is illustrated in 2026 study of the binary pulsar PSR J1856–0039.. From this article:

The mass–mass diagram for the PSR J1856–0039 DNS system. The gray region is not allowed by the mass function (for sin(i) <= 1). The constraints on possible NS masses by the 1σ uncertainties of three post-Keplerian parameters ωdot, Pdot, and γ, which are plotted under the assumption that general relativity is correct. The uncertainty in the ωdot region is thinner than the line in the figure. The constrained regions intersect in a small section (see the enlarged view in the upper right corner), confirming that GR is sufficient.

The measurements made of the orbital decay of the PSR B1913+16 system were a near perfect match to Einstein's equations. Relativity predicts that over time a binary system's orbital energy will be converted to gravitational radiation. Data collected by Taylor and Joel M. Weisberg and their colleagues of the orbital period of PSR B1913+16 supported this relativistic prediction; they reported in 1982 and subsequently that there was a difference in the observed minimum separation of the two pulsars compared to that expected if the orbital separation had remained constant. In the decade following its discovery, the system's orbital period had decreased by about 76 millionths of a second per year, indicating that the pulsar was approaching its maximum separation more than a second earlier than it would have if the orbit had remained the same. Subsequent observations continue to show this decrease.

== Intermediate mass binary pulsar ==
An intermediate-mass binary pulsar (IMBP) is a pulsar-white dwarf binary system with a relatively long spin period of around 10–200 ms consisting of a white dwarf with a relatively high mass of approximately $\,\geq 0.4 M_{\odot}.$ The spin periods, magnetic field strengths, and orbital eccentricities of IMBPs are significantly larger than those of low mass binary pulsars (LMBPs). As of 2014, there are fewer than 20 known IMBPs. Examples of IMBPs include PSR J1802−2124 and PSR J2222−0137.

The binary system PSR J2222−0137 has an orbital period of about 2.45 days and is found at a distance of 267^{+1.2}_{-0.9} pc (approximately 870 light-years), making it the second closest known binary pulsar systems (as of 2014) and one of the closest pulsars and neutron stars. The relatively high-mass pulsar (1.831 $\pm$ 0.010 $M_{\odot}$) has a companion star PSR J2222−0137 B with a minimum mass of approximately 1.3 solar masses (1.319 $\pm$ 0.004 $M_{\odot}$). This meant the companion is a massive white dwarf (only about 8% of white dwarfs have a mass $\,\geq 0.9 M_{\odot}$), which would make the system an IMBP. Although initial measurements gave a mass of about 1 solar mass for the PSR J2222−0137 B, later observations showed that it is actually a high-mass white dwarf and also one of the coolest known white dwarfs, with a temperature less than 3,000 K. PSR J2222−0137 B is likely crystallized, leading to this Earth-sized white dwarf being described as a "diamond-star", similar to the white dwarf companion of PSR J1719-1438, which lies about 4,000 light-years away.

== Effects ==
Sometimes the relatively normal companion star of a binary pulsar will swell up to the point that it overflows its Roche lobe and dumps its outer layers onto the pulsar. This interaction can heat the gas being exchanged between the bodies and produce X-ray light which can appear to pulsate, in a process called the X-ray binary stage. The flow of matter from one stellar body to another often leads to the creation of an accretion disk (limited by the Eddington luminosity) about the recipient star.

Pulsars also create a "wind" of relativistically outflowing particles, which in the case of binary pulsars can blow away the magnetosphere of their companions and have a dramatic effect on the pulse emission.

== See also ==
- PSR B1913+16 – Pulsar in the constellation Aquila
- PSR J0737-3039 – Double pulsar in the constellation Puppis
- Square Kilometre Array – International radio telescope project
