= WSJT (amateur radio software) =

Software

WSJT-X
- Developer: Joe Taylor, K1JT
- Release: 2005
- Stable release: 2.7.0 / Feb 17 2023
- Written in: C++ (Qt GUI), Fortran, C
- Operating system: 32-bit Windows NT or later, Unix, Unix-like
- Available in: Software: English; Documentation: English, Dutch, Finnish, French, German, Hungarian, Italian, Japanese, Portuguese, Russian, Serbian, Slovak, Spanish
- Type: Amateur radio and DSP
- License: GPL
- Website: https://wsjt.sourceforge.io/wsjtx.html

WSJT-X is a computer program used for weak-signal radio communication between amateur radio operators. The program was initially written by Joe Taylor, K1JT, but is now open source and is developed by a small team. The digital signal processing techniques in WSJT-X make it substantially easier for amateur radio operators to employ exotic propagation modes, such as high-speed meteor scatter and moonbounce. Additionally WSJT is able to send signal reports to spotting networks such as PSK Reporter.

== History ==
WSJT, the predecessor to WSJT-X, was originally released in 2001 and has undergone several major revisions. Communication modes have been both added and removed from the software over the course of its development. Since 2005, the software has been released as open source software under the GNU General Public License. This licensing change required substantial rewrites and took several months to complete. Although Joe Taylor was the original developer (and still acts as maintainer), several programmers are currently involved in writing the software. The latest version of WSJT (not to be confused with WSJT-X) is written in Python and C, with several utilities written in Fortran.

WSJT versions up through 7.06 r1933 (referred to as colloquially as WSJT7) and earlier were aggregations of previous versions, and as such WSJT7 contained 16 different modes (FSK441, JT6M, JT65 variants A - C, JT2, JT4 variants A - G, WSPR, and a preview of JT64A). As of version 8.0 (referred to as colloquially as WSJT8) the available modes changed completely such that WSJT8 now offers 5 different modes (JTMS, ISCAT, JT64A, JT8, and Echo) - none of which are back-compatible with WSJT7 or earlier releases. This backwards-incompatibility includes JT64A, such that the preview release of JT64A in WSJT7 cannot communicate with the stable release of JT64A in WSJT8. As of May 2018, the latest WSJT version is WSJT10.

== Communication modes provided ==
The software carries a general emphasis on weak-signal operation and advanced DSP techniques; however, the communication modes rely upon different ionospheric propagation modes and may be used on many different bands.

WSJT's communication modes can be divided into fast and slow modes. While fast modes send character-by-character without error correction, the slow modes aim to optimize for minimal QRO (high-power) use. As of WSJT10, supported fast modes are JTMS, FSK441, ISCAT, and JT6M, and the slow modes are JT65 and JT4. WSJT-X 1.8 additionally implements the "slow" JT9, FT8, and QRA64. Some modes have derived submodes with larger tone spacing. Two other modes, WSPR and Echo are included for measuring propagation and testing moon bounce echo.

=== FSK441 ===
FSK441, introduced in 2001 as the first communications mode included with WSJT, is designed to support meteor scatter communication using radio-reflecting meteor trails. The bursts of signal created by such trails are commonly referred to as "pings", due to their characteristic sound. Such pings may be as short as a tenth of a second and carry enough information to complete at least one stage of a contact. FSK441 employs multi-frequency shift keying using four tones, at a data rate of 441 baud. Because of the choice of character codes in the protocol, it is self-synchronizing and does not require an explicit synchronization tone. FSK441 is generally used on the 2-meter and 70-centimeter amateur bands. Contacts may be made at almost any time (that is, a meteor shower is not required to be in progress) at distances of up to 1400 miles (2250 km).

Transmitted messages include at least one space, the FSK441 decoding algorithm uses that space character as a syncword for zero-overhead synchronization.

This mode is no longer included in WSJT-X as of version 2.1.2.

=== JT6M ===
JT6M, introduced in late 2002, is intended for meteor scatter and other ionospheric scattering of signals, and is especially optimized for the 6-meter band. The mode also employs multiple frequency-shift keying, but at 44 tones. One of the tones is a synchronization tone, leaving 43 tones to carry data (one tone per character in the character set, which includes alphanumerics and some punctuation). The symbol rate is 21.53 baud; the actual data rate as encoded for transmit is 14.4 characters per second. The mode is known for sounding "a bit like piccolo music".

This mode is no longer included in WSJT-X as of version 2.1.2.

=== JT65 ===
JT65, developed and released in late 2003, is intended for extremely weak but slowly varying signals, such as those found on troposcatter or Earth-Moon-Earth (EME, or "moonbounce") paths. It can decode signals many decibels below the noise floor in a 2500 Hz band (note that SNR in a 2500 Hz band is approximately 28 dB lower than SNR in a 4 Hz band, which is closer to the channel bandwidth of an individual JT65 tone), and can often allow amateurs to successfully exchange contact information without signals being audible to the human ear. Like the other modes, multiple-frequency shift keying is employed; unlike the other modes, messages are transmitted as atomic units after being compressed and then encoded with a process known as forward error correction (or "FEC"). The FEC adds redundancy to the data, such that all of a message may be successfully recovered even if some bits are not received by the receiver. (The particular code used for JT65 is Reed-Solomon.) Because of this FEC process, messages are either decoded correctly or not decoded at all, with very high probability. After messages are encoded, they are transmitted using MFSK with 65 tones.

Operators have also begun using the JT65 mode for contacts on the HF bands, often using QRP (very low transmit power); while the mode was not originally intended for such use, its popularity has resulted in several new features being added to WSJT in order to facilitate HF operation.

=== JT9 ===
JT9, intended for MF and HF use, was introduced in WSJT-X, which was at the time an experimental version of WSJT. It uses the same logical encoding as JT65, but modulates to a 9-FSK signal. With 1-minute transmission intervals, JT9 occupies less than 16 Hz bandwidth. (JT9 also had versions designed for longer transmission intervals of 2 minutes, 5 minutes, 10 minutes or 30 minutes. Those extended versions took increasingly less bandwidth and permitted reception of even weaker signals.)

=== FT8 ===
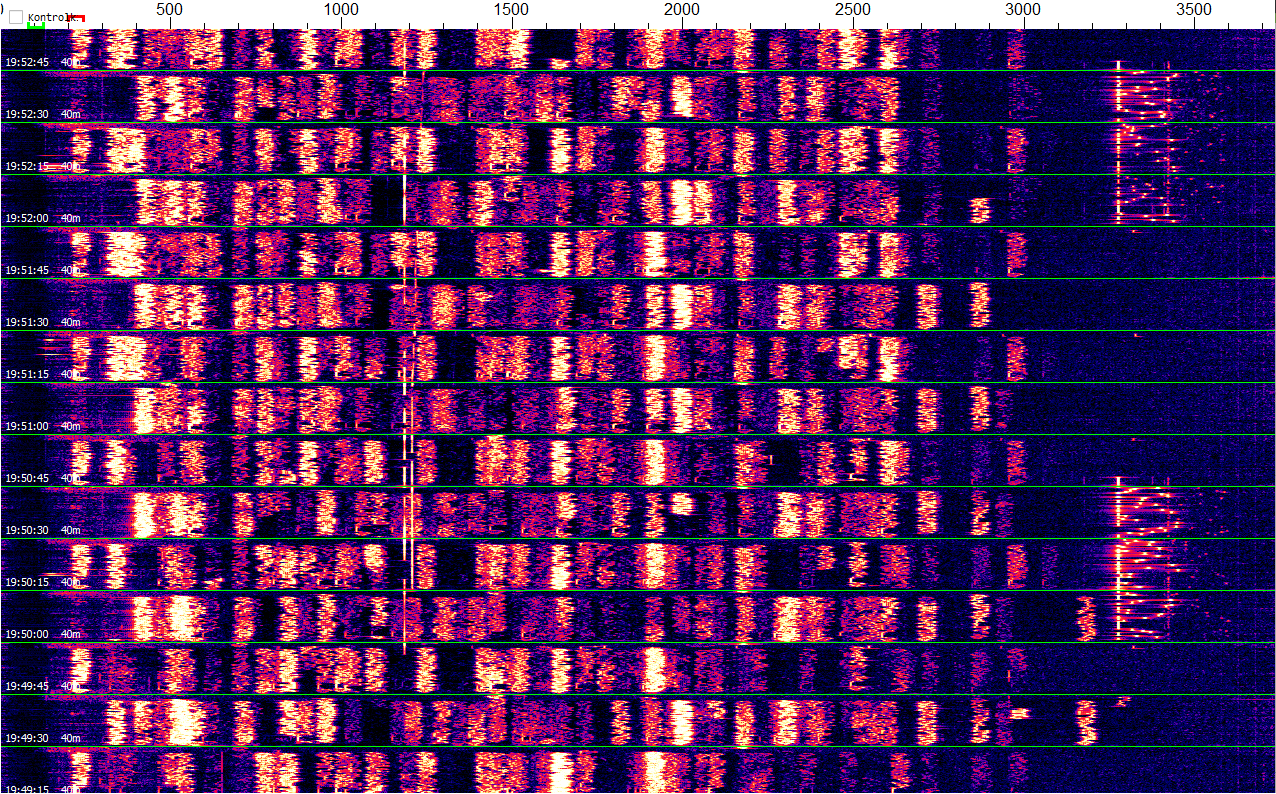
A waterfall plot for FT8 signals (bandwidth 50 Hz) in the 40-meter band and for JT65 on the right (bandwidth 180 Hz)

Joe Taylor, K1JT, announced on June 29, 2017, the availability of a new mode in the WSJT-X software, FT8. FT8 stands for "Franke-Taylor design, 8-FSK modulation" and was created by Joe Taylor, K1JT and Steve Franke, K9AN. It is described as being designed for "multi-hop Es where signals may be weak and fading, openings may be short, and you want fast completion of reliable, confirmable QSO's".

According to Taylor, the important characteristics of FT8 are —

- T/R sequence length: 15 s
- Message length: 75 bits + 12-bit CRC
- FEC code: (174,87) LDPC
- Modulation: 8-FSK, keying rate = 6.25 baud; tone spacing = 6.25 Hz
- Waveform: Continuous phase, constant envelope
- Occupied bandwidth: 50 Hz
- Synchronization: three 7x7 Costas arrays (start, middle, end of transmission)
- Transmission duration: 79*1920/12000 = 12.64 s
- Decoding threshold: -24 dB (with a priori decoding)
- Operational behavior: similar to HF usage of JT9, JT65
- Multi-decoder: finds and decodes all FT8 signals in passband
- Auto-sequencing after manual start of QSO

Compared to the so-called "slow modes" (JT9, JT65, QRA64), FT8 is a few decibels less sensitive, but allows completion of QSOs four times faster. Bandwidth is greater than JT9, but about one-quarter of JT65A and less than one-half of QRA64. Compared with the "fast modes" (JT9E-H), FT8 is significantly more sensitive, has much narrower bandwidth, uses the vertical waterfall, and offers multi-decoding over the full displayed passband. The mode also supports two-pass decoding and use of "a priori (already known) information as it accumulates during a QSO".

=== FT4 ===
In 2019, Taylor, et al., introduced FT4, an experimental protocol which is similar to FT8 but has a shorter T/R sequence length for faster contest exchanges. FT4 accomplishes this increase in speed by using Gaussian frequency-shift keying and using 90 Hz of bandwidth.

== Alternative software for JT65 ==
There are alternative software packages available for JT65 including MultiPSK (a commercial package developed by F6CTE), and JT65-HF HB9HQX Edition (a free software package forked from the JT65-HF project developed by W6CQZ). The JT65-HF HB9HQX Edition software, along with the source code, may be obtained from SourceForge.

An article series on using the original JT65-HF software appeared in CQ Amateur Radio's October & November 2010 issues. And MSHV from LZ2HV recompiled from source code of WSJT-X with different GUI implementation both for Linux and Windows OS.
