= PSR J2222−0137 =

Intermediate-mass binary pulsar

PSR J2222−0137 is a nearby intermediate-mass binary pulsar at a distance of 267+1.2
−0.9 pc (approximately 870 light-years), whose low-mass neutron star's companion is a white dwarf (PSR J2222−0137 B). The white dwarf has a relatively large mass of 1.319 ± 0.004 M_{☉} and a temperature less than 3,000 K, meaning it is likely crystallized, leading to this Earth-sized white dwarf being described as a "diamond-star".
