= PSK Reporter =

Amateur radio signal reporting network

- Website type: Analytics
- Available in: English
- Founded: 2014; 12 years ago
- Founder: Philip Gladstone
- Website: pskreporter.info

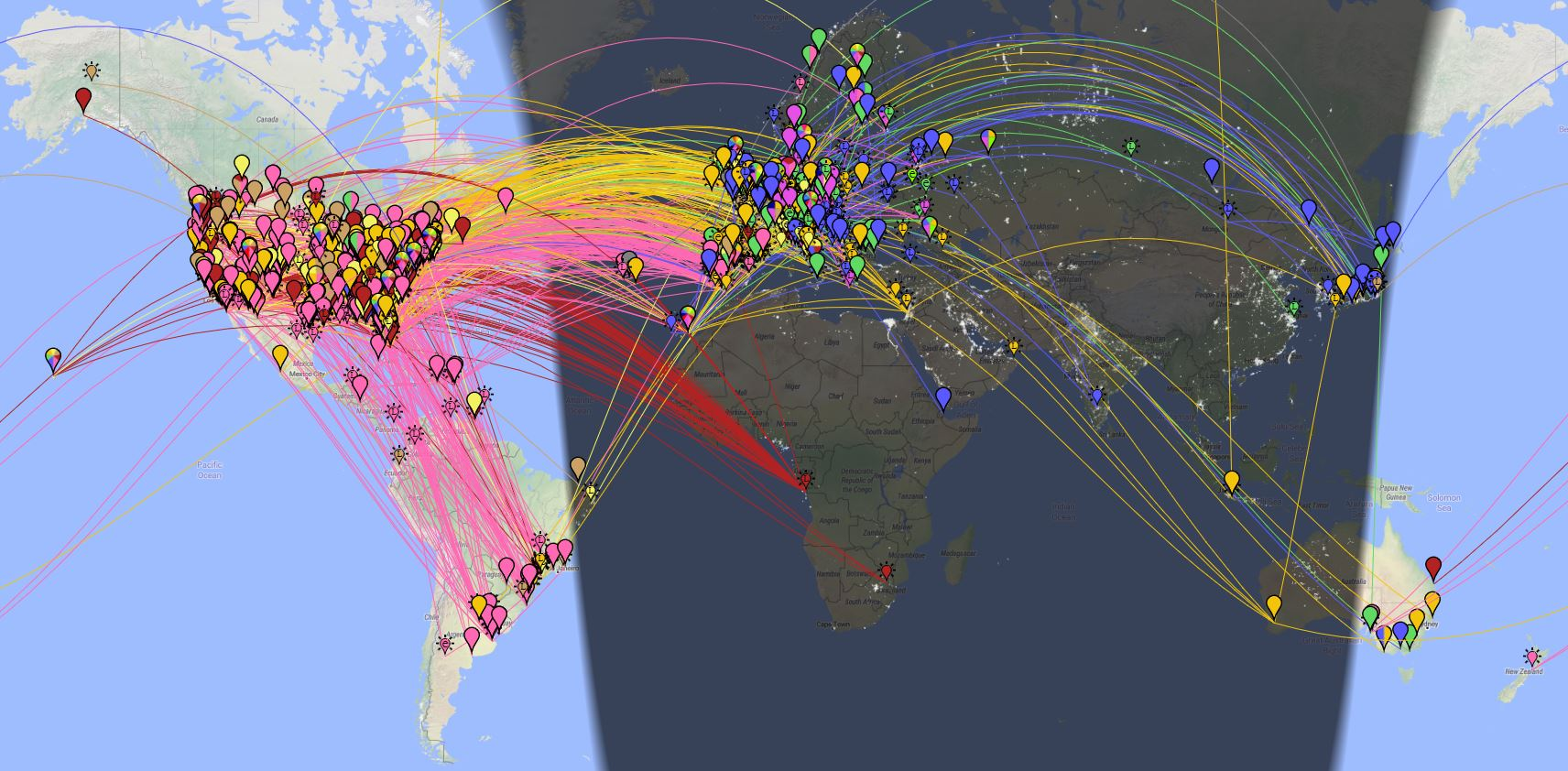
Screenshot of PSK Reporter

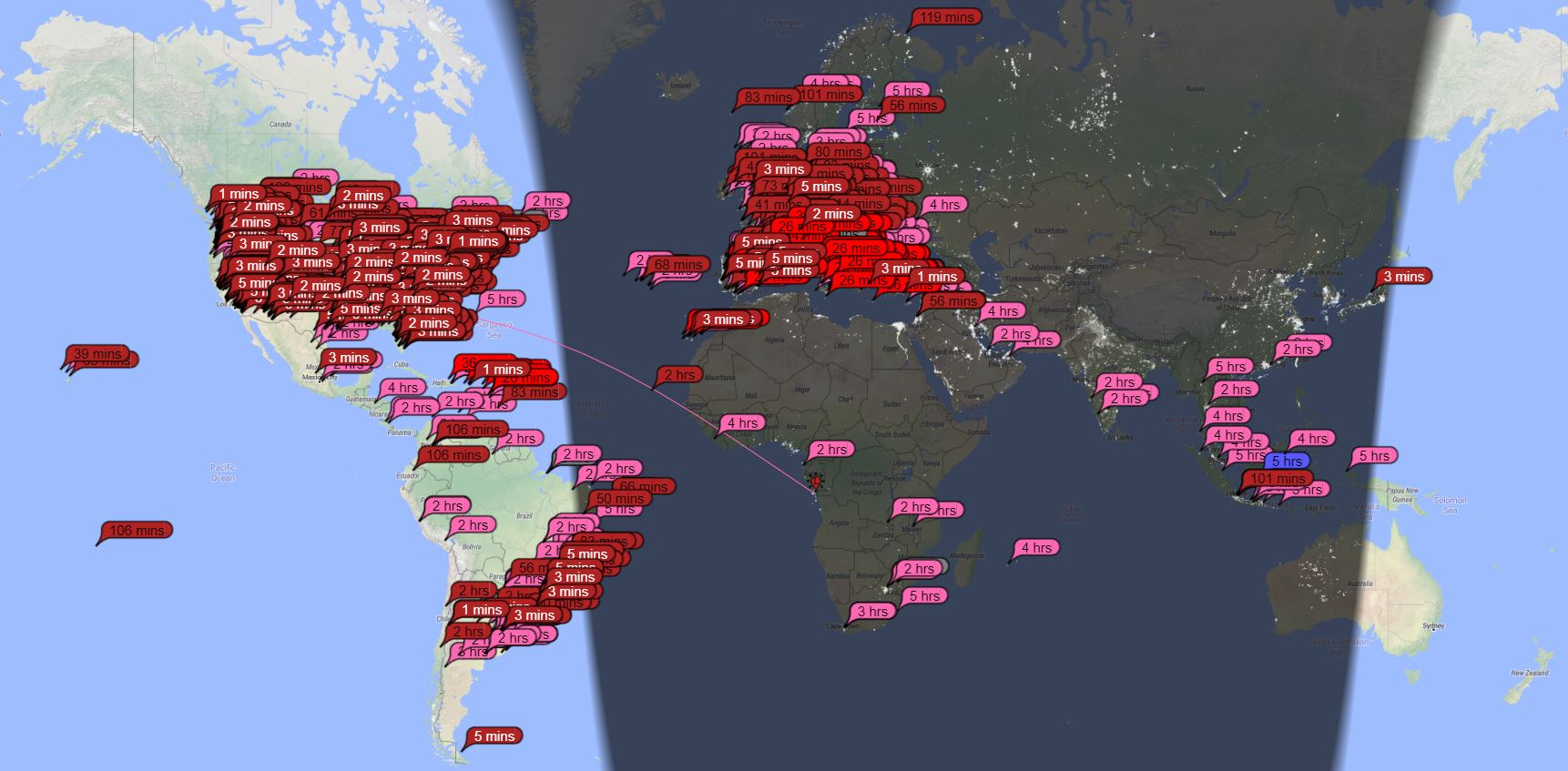
24 hours of reception reports for Station D2UY

PSK Reporter is an amateur radio signal reporting and spotting network and website started by Philip Gladstone in 2014 which allows operators to see where their radio signals are being received.

The platform works by collecting digital signal reports from software clients such as WSJT and FLDIGI, then mapping them to show which stations are being heard by other clients.

The website takes its name from the popular amateur radio digital mode PSK31. It supports numerous digital modes, but now the vast majority of digital reports recorded by the service are FT8 traffic. Most traffic recorded on PSK Reporter is in the HF amateur radio bands, but the platform also supports MF, VHF, and UHF bands.

As of 2021, PSK Reporter had collected over 20 billion reception reports.

== Scientific uses ==
Reporting networks such as PSK Reporter allow researchers in near real time to evaluate space weather conditions, particularly changes in the earth's ionosphere.

There are multiple examples of PSK Reporter being used to aid researchers, as well as aiding in the prediction and understand of radio propagation. Observations made during the 2017 eclipse included over 5,000 amateur radio operators' reception reports, which helped researchers document the eclipse's effect on HF communications.

PSK Reporter data has been used for research in UHF and VHF radio propagation, to help improve machine learning algorithms that predict HF propagation, and to evaluate and test the performance of installed antennas.
