= Harold E. Taylor =

American physics professor (1939–2001)

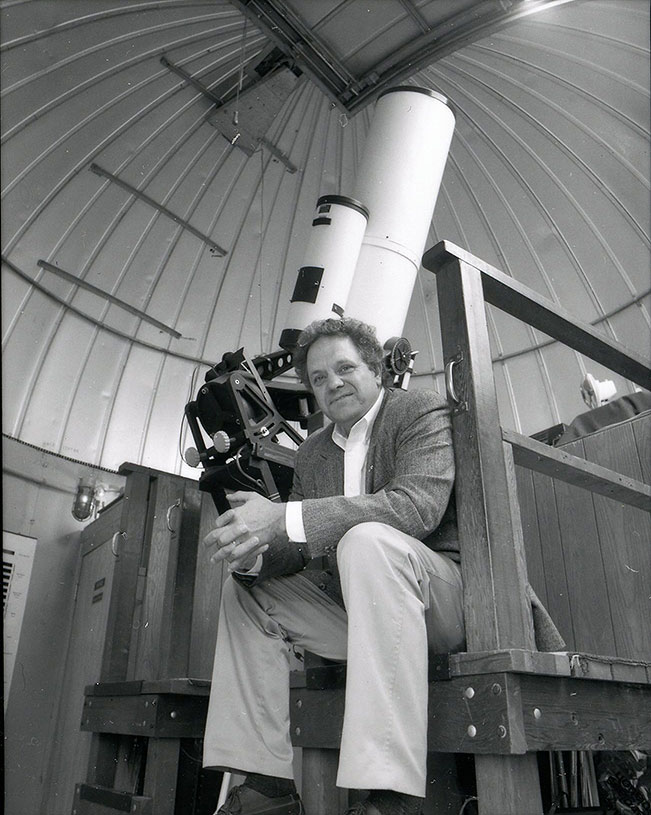
- Born: 1939
- Died: 27 December 2001
- Education: Haverford College; MIT; University of Iowa
- Scientific career
- Fields: Physics, meteorology, astronomy
- Workplaces: Richard Stockton College of New Jersey

Harold E. Taylor, Haverford College, MIT, and University of Iowa alumnus, was a professor of physics at The Richard Stockton College of New Jersey for over 30 years. As one of the original faculty members, Taylor did research and instructed in the subjects of astrophysics, meteorology, astronomy, electronics, and general physics. One of the research projects Taylor instrumented was a large groundwater source heat pump system to heat and cool the entire academic complex at Stockton. This geothermal well-based system saves the institution around US$500,000 per year in electricity for heating and cooling. He was the brother of Nobel laureate Joseph Hooton Taylor Jr.

In his early college years, he was a notable soccer player.

== Extra curricular activities ==
Taylor also chaired the local Amnesty International chapter in Atlantic County, New Jersey. Hal died in December 2001. The college has since renamed the campus observatory, which he helped facilitate in 1974, in his honor.

== Family ==
He is the brother of Nobel Prize in Physics laureate Joseph Hooton Taylor Jr.

== Honours ==
There is also a school scholarship in his name, the Dr. Harold E. Taylor Physics Award Endowment .

The Stockton astronomical observatory is named after him.

== Amateur radio ==
During their youth, Joseph and Hal were enthusiasts of amateur radio. Together they erected numerous large, rotating antennas, high above the roof of their family's three-story Victorian farmhouse. Their radios were mostly built from a mixture of post-war surplus equipment and junk television sets. Later in life, Hal moved back to the family farm following the death of their father to carry on the tradition and help run the farm. He was known to be interviewed by local news stations during times of extreme weather, such as droughts.

== Athletics ==
Hal was one of Haverford College's greatest and most admired athletes ever. As a right fullback in soccer he was selected to the first All-American team in an era when there was only one such eleven, covering all colleges in the country.
