= Joseph Hooton Taylor Jr. =

American astrophysicist

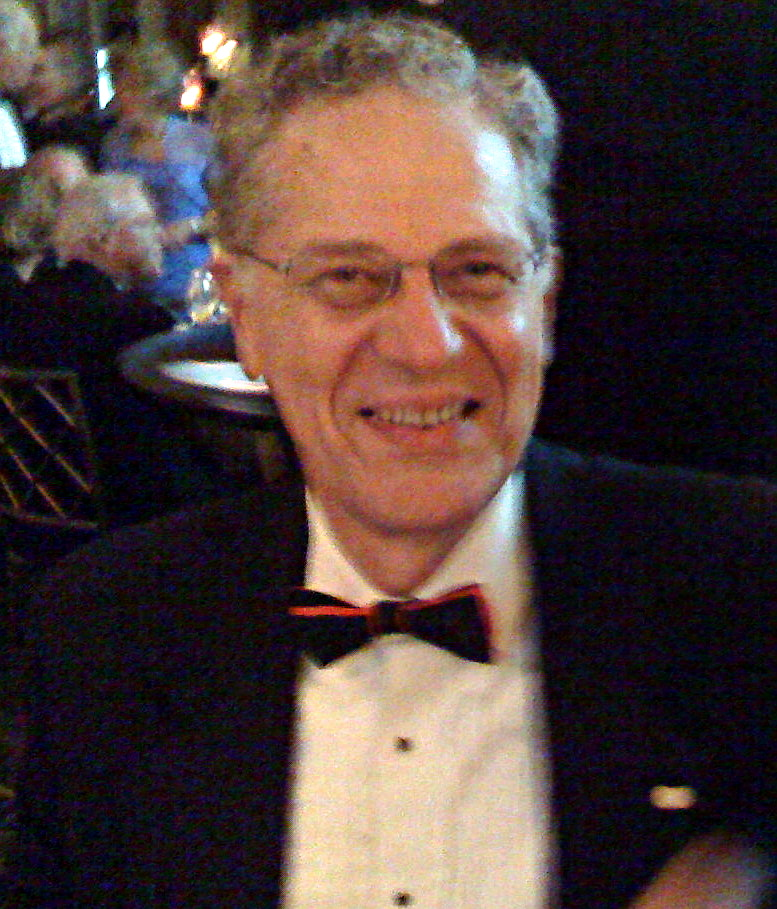
- Taylor in 2008
- Born: March 29, 1941 (age 85); Philadelphia, Pennsylvania, U.S.
- Citizenship: American
- Education: Haverford College; Harvard University
- Known for: Pulsars, WSJT-X
- Awards: Dannie Heineman Prize for Astrophysics (1980); Henry Draper Medal (1985); Magellanic Premium (1990); John J. Carty Award (1991); Wolf Prize in Physics (1992); Nobel Prize in Physics (1993)
- Scientific career
- Fields: Physics
- Workplaces: Princeton University; University of Massachusetts Amherst; Five College Radio Astronomy Observatory
- Doctoral students: Russell Alan Hulse, Victoria Kaspi, Ingrid Stairs

Joseph Hooton Taylor Jr. (born March 29, 1941) is an American astrophysicist. He shared the 1993 Nobel Prize in physics with Russell Alan Hulse "for the discovery of a new type of pulsar, a discovery that has opened up new possibilities for the study of gravitation". This was the first indirect detection of gravitational waves, later directly detected by Barry Barish, Kip Thorne and Rainer Weiss.

== Early life and education ==
Taylor was born in Philadelphia to Joseph Hooton Taylor Sr. and Sylvia Evans Taylor, both of whom had Quaker roots for many generations, and grew up in Cinnaminson Township, New Jersey. He attended the Moorestown Friends School in Moorestown Township, New Jersey, where he excelled in math.

He received a B.A. in physics at Haverford College in 1963, and a Ph.D. in astronomy at Harvard University in 1968. After a brief research position at Harvard, Taylor went to the University of Massachusetts Amherst, eventually becoming Professor of Astronomy and Associate Director of the Five College Radio Astronomy Observatory.

Taylor's thesis work was on lunar occultation measurements. About the time he completed his Ph.D., Jocelyn Bell (who is also a Quaker) discovered the first radio pulsars with a telescope near Cambridge, England.

== Career ==
Taylor immediately went to the National Radio Astronomy Observatory's telescopes in Green Bank, West Virginia, and participated in the discovery of the first pulsars discovered outside Cambridge. Since then, he has worked on all aspects of pulsar astrophysics.

In 1974, Hulse and Taylor discovered the first pulsar in a binary system, named PSR B1913+16 after its position in the sky, during a survey for pulsars at the Arecibo Observatory in Puerto Rico. Although it was not understood at the time, this was also the first of what are now called recycled pulsars: Neutron stars that have been spun-up to fast spin rates by the transfer of mass onto their surfaces from a companion star.

The orbit of this binary system is slowly shrinking as it loses energy because of emission of gravitational radiation, causing its orbital period to speed up slightly. The rate of shrinkage can be precisely predicted from Einstein's General Theory of Relativity, and over a thirty-year period Taylor and his colleagues have made measurements that match this prediction to much better than one percent accuracy. This was the first confirmation of the existence of gravitational radiation. There are now scores of binary pulsars known, and independent measurements have confirmed Taylor's results.

Taylor has used this first binary pulsar to make high-precision tests of general relativity. Working with his colleague Joel Weisberg, Taylor has used observations of this pulsar to demonstrate the existence of gravitational radiation in the amount and with the properties first predicted by Albert Einstein. He and Hulse shared the Nobel Prize in Physics (1993) for the discovery of this object. In 1980, he moved to Princeton University, where he was the James S. McDonnell Distinguished University Professor in Physics, having also served for six years as Dean of Faculty. He retired in 2006.

== Amateur radio ==
Joe Taylor first obtained his amateur radio license as a teenager, which led him to the field of radio astronomy. Taylor is well known in the field of amateur radio weak signal communication and has been assigned the call sign K1JT by the FCC. He had previously held the callsigns K2ITP, WA1LXQ, W1HFV, and VK2BJX (the latter in Australia).

His amateur radio accomplishments have included mounting an 'expedition' in April 2010 to use the Arecibo Radio Telescope to conduct moonbounce with amateurs around the world using voice, Morse code, and digital communications.

He has been active in developing several computer programs and communications protocols, including WSPR and WSJT ("Weak Signal/Joe Taylor"), a software package and protocol suite that utilizes computer-generated messages in conjunction with radio transceivers to communicate over long distances with other amateur radio operators.

WSJT is useful for passing short messages via non-traditional radio communications methods, such as moonbounce and meteor scatter and other low signal-to-noise ratio paths. It is also useful for extremely long-distance contacts using very low power transmissions.

Taylor is also the co-creator of the FT8 mode.

== Honors and awards ==
- Heineman Prize of the American Astronomical Society (1980)(inaugural)
- Fellow of the American Academy of Arts and Sciences (1982)
- Henry Draper Medal of the National Academy of Sciences (1985)
- Tomalla Foundation Prize (1987)
- Magellanic Premium (1990)
- Albert Einstein Medal (1991)
- John J. Carty Award for the Advancement of Science of the National Academy of Sciences (1991) (physics)
- Wolf Prize in Physics (1992)
- Member of the American Philosophical Society (1992)
- Nobel Prize in Physics (1993)
- Golden Plate Award of the American Academy of Achievement (1995)
- Karl Schwarzschild Medal (1997)
- Asteroid 81859 Joetaylor, discovered by LINEAR in 2000, was named on the occasion of his retirement as a professor at Princeton University in 2006. The official naming citation was published by the Minor Planet Center on 9 November 2006 (M.P.C. 57952).

Taylor was among the first group of MacArthur Fellows. He has served on many boards, committees, and panels, co-chairing the Decadal Panel of that produced the report Astronomy and Astrophysics in the New Millennium that established the United States's national priorities in astronomy and astrophysics for the period 2000–2010. He was a guest of honor in the 2009 International Physics Olympiad.

== See also ==
- Harold E. Taylor, brother – physicist
