= Russell Alan Hulse =

American physicist

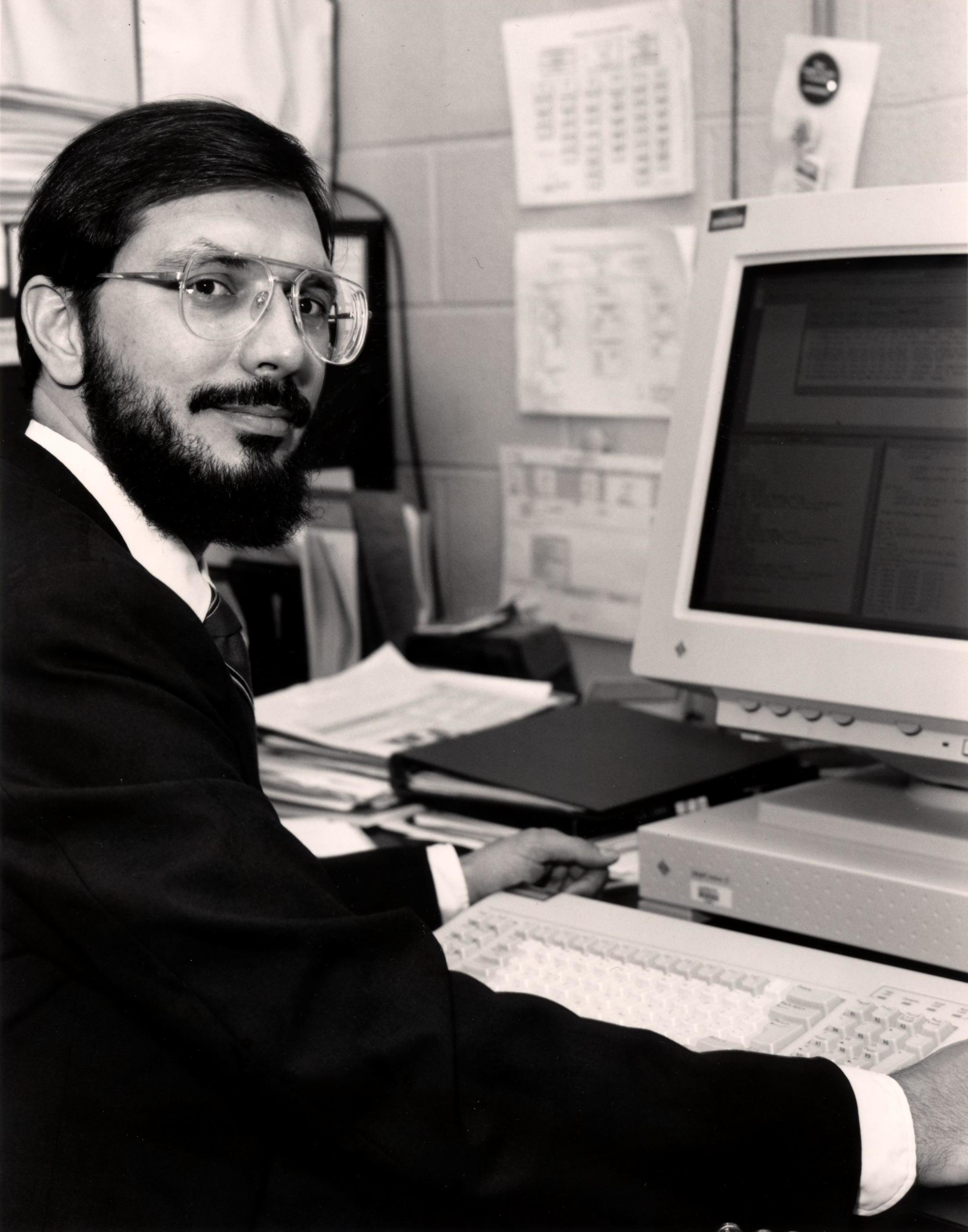
- Hulse at the Princeton Plasma Physics Laboratory
- Born: November 28, 1950 (age 75); New York City, U.S.
- Citizenship: American
- Education: Cooper Union (BS); UMass Amherst (PhD)
- Awards: Nobel Prize in Physics (1993)
- Scientific career
- Workplaces: UT Dallas; Princeton Plasma Physics Laboratory; NRAO
- Doctoral advisor: Joseph Hooton Taylor Jr.

Russell Alan Hulse (born November 28, 1950) is an American astrophysicist. He shared the 1993 Nobel Prize in Physics with Joseph Hooton Taylor "for the discovery of a new type of pulsar, a discovery that has opened up new possibilities for the study of gravitation". This was the first indirect detection of gravitational waves, later directly detected by Kip Thorne, Barry Barish and Rainer Weiss.

== Biography ==
Hulse was born in New York City and graduated from the Bronx High School of Science and the Cooper Union. He received his PhD in physics from the University of Massachusetts Amherst in 1975.

While working on his PhD dissertation, he was a scholar in 1974 at the Arecibo Observatory in Puerto Rico of Cornell University. There he worked with Taylor on a large-scale survey for pulsars. It was this work that led to the discovery of the first binary pulsar.

In 1974, Hulse and Taylor discovered binary pulsar PSR B1913, which is made up of a pulsar and black companion star. Neutron star rotation emits pulses that are extremely regular and stable in the radio wave region and is nearby condensed material body gravitation (non-detectable in the visible field). Hulse, Taylor, and other colleagues have used this first binary pulsar to make high-precision tests of general relativity, demonstrating the existence of gravitational radiation. An approximation of this radiant energy is described by the formula of the quadrupolar radiation of Albert Einstein (1918).

In 1979, researchers announced measurements of small acceleration effects of the orbital movements of a pulsar. This was initial proof that the system of these two moving masses emits gravitational waves.

In 1993, Hulse and Taylor shared the Nobel Prize in Physics for the discovery of the first binary pulsar.

== Later years ==
After receiving his PhD, Hulse did postdoctoral work at the National Radio Astronomy Observatory in Green Bank, West Virginia. He moved to Princeton, where he has worked for many years at the Princeton Plasma Physics Laboratory. He has also worked on science education, and in 2003 joined the University of Texas at Dallas as a visiting professor of physics and of mathematics and science education.

Hulse was elected a Fellow of the American Association for the Advancement of Science in 2003, and is cited in the American Men and Women of Science.

In 2004, Hulse joined University of Texas at Dallas and became the Founding Director of UT Dallas Science and Engineering Education Center (SEEC).

In July 2007 Hulse joined the Aurora Imaging Technology advisory board.
