= Meteor burst communications =

Radio propagation mode

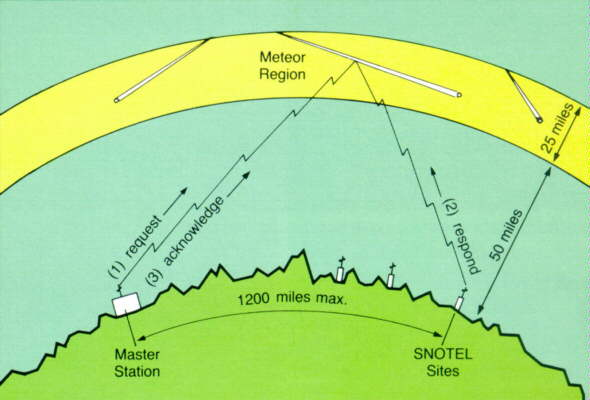
Meteor scatter propagation

Meteor burst communications (MBC), also referred to as meteor scatter communications, is a radio propagation mode that exploits the ionized trails of meteors during atmospheric entry to establish brief communications paths between radio stations up to 2,250 kilometres (1,400 mi) apart. There can be forward-scatter or back-scatter of the radio waves.

== How it works ==
As the Earth moves along its orbital path, millions of particles known as meteoroids enter the Earth's atmosphere every day, a small fraction of which have properties useful for point-to-point communication. When these meteoroids begin to burn up, they create a glowing trail of ionized particles (called a meteor) in the E layer of the atmosphere that can persist for up to several seconds. The ionization trails can be very dense and thus used to reflect radio waves. The frequencies that can be reflected by any particular ion trail are determined by the intensity of the ionization created by the meteor, often a function of the initial size of the particle, and are generally between 30 MHz and 50 MHz.

The distance over which communications can be established is determined by the altitude at which the ionization is created, the location over the surface of the Earth where the meteoroid is falling, the angle of entry into the atmosphere, and the relative locations of the stations attempting to establish communications. Because these ionization trails only exist for fractions of a second to as long as a few seconds, they create only brief windows of opportunity for communications.

== Development ==
The earliest direct observation of interaction between meteors and radio propagation was reported in 1929 by Hantaro Nagaoka of Japan. In 1931, Greenleaf Pickard noticed that bursts of long-distance propagation occurred at times of major meteor showers. At the same time, Bell Labs researcher A. M. Skellett was studying ways to improve night-time radio propagation, and suggested that the oddities that many researchers were seeing were due to meteors. The next year Schafer and Goodall noted that the atmosphere was disturbed during that year's Leonid meteor shower, prompting Skellett to postulate that the mechanism was reflection or scattering from electrons in meteor trails. In 1944, while researching a radar system that was "pointed up" to detect the V-2 missiles falling on London, James Stanley Hey confirmed that the meteor trails were in fact reflecting radio signals.

In 1946 the US Federal Communications Commission (FCC) found a direct correlation between enhancements in very high frequency (VHF) radio signals and individual meteors. Studies conducted in the early 1950s by the National Bureau of Standards and the Stanford Research Institute had limited success at actually using this as a medium.

The first serious effort to utilize this technique was carried out by the Canadian Defence Research Board in the early 1950s. Their project, "JANET" (named for Janus, who looked both ways), sent bursts of data pre-recorded on magnetic tape from their radar research station in Prince Albert, Saskatchewan to Toronto, a distance exceeding 2,000 km. A 90 MHz "carrier" signal was monitored for sudden increases in signal strength, signalling a meteor, which triggered a burst of data. The system was used operationally starting in 1952, and provided useful communications until the radar project was shut down around 1960.

== Military use ==
One of the first major deployments was "COMET" (COmmunication by MEteor Trails), used for long-range communications with NATO's Supreme Headquarters Allied Powers Europe headquarters. COMET became operational in 1965, and used for communications between the Netherlands and France. COMET maintained an average throughput between 115 and 310 bits per second, depending on the time of year.

Meteor burst communications faded from interest with the increasing use of satellite communications systems starting in the late 1960s. In the late 1970s it became clear that the satellites were not as universally useful as originally thought, notably at high latitudes or where signal security was an issue. For these reasons, the U.S. Air Force installed the Alaska Air Command MBC system in the 1970s, although it is not publicly known whether this system is still operational.

In the 1970s, the Alaskan Meteor Burst Communications System (AMBCS), a testbed set up by SAIC was created under DARPA funding. Using phase-steerable antennas directed at the proper area of the sky for any given time of day, in the direction where the Earth is moving "forward", AMBCS was able to greatly improve the data rates, averaging 4 kilobits per second (kbit/s). While satellites may have a nominal throughput about 14 times as great, they are vastly more expensive to operate.

Additional gains in throughput are theoretically possible through the use of real-time steering. The basic concept is to use backscattered signals to pinpoint the exact location of the ion trail and direct the antenna to that spot, or in some cases, several trails simultaneously. This improves the gain, allowing much improved data rates. To date, this approach has not been tried experimentally, so far as is known.

== Scientific use ==
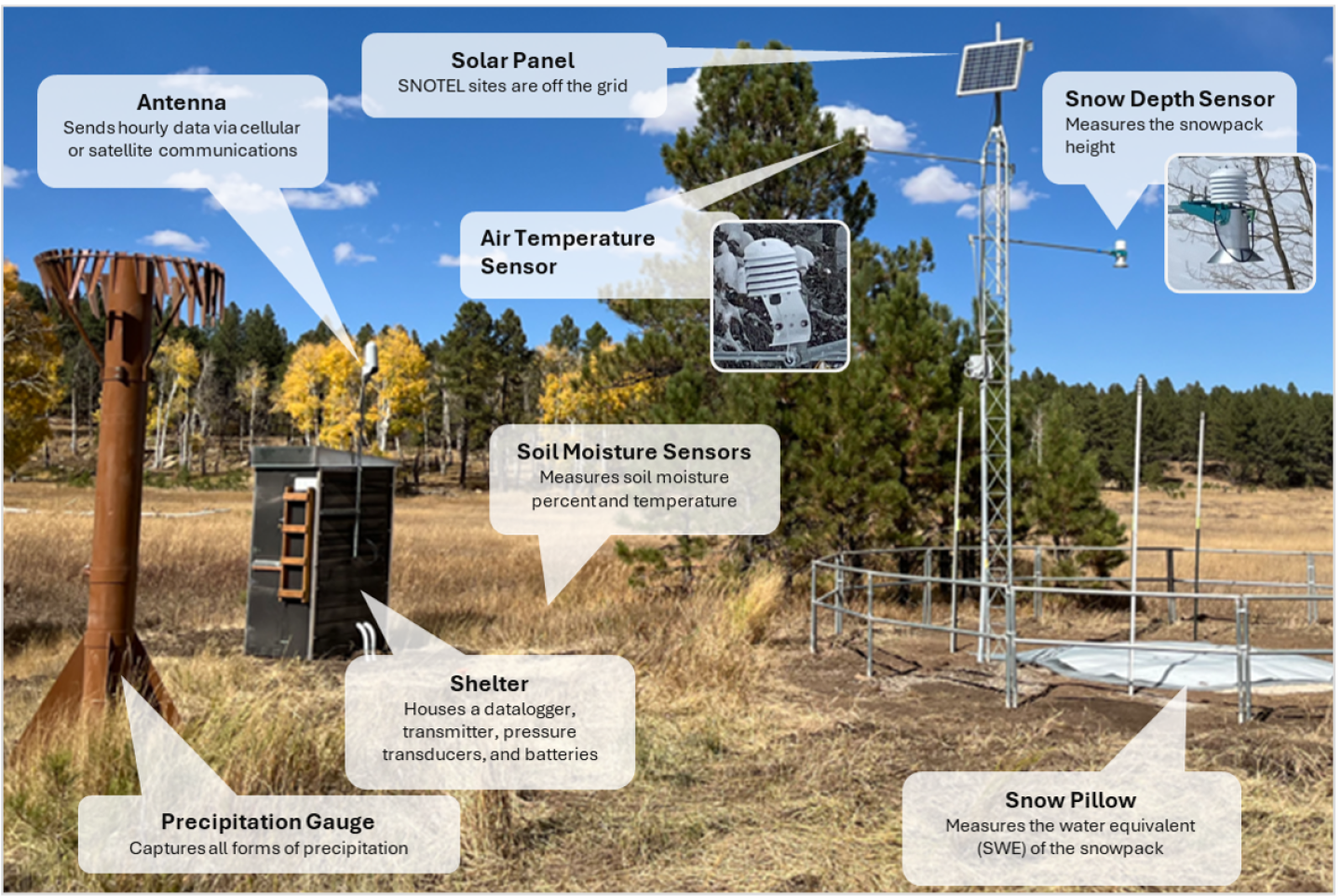
SNOTEL diagram

The United States Department of Agriculture (USDA) used meteor scatter extensively in its SNOTEL system for over 40 years, but discontinued this use in 2023. Over 900 snow water content gauging stations in the Western United States were equipped with radio transmitters that relied upon meteor-scatter communications to send measurements to a data center.

According to unclassified report, SNOTEL "contains 2 master stations and more than 500 remote data acquisition sites in 11 western states. The system monitors snowfall and other meteorological data. The 500 unmanned, remote stations are divided into selectively addressed groups of approximately 60 remote stations in each group. Polling a group of 60 stations takes an average of 5 minutes".

== Amateur radio use ==
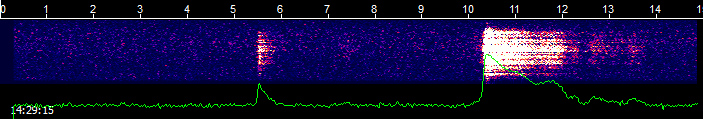
The recording of MSK144 signals at 50 MHz on the 15 second long waterfall trace

Most meteor-scatter communication is conducted between radio stations that are engaged in a precise schedule of transmission and reception periods. Because the presence of a meteor trail at a suitable location between two stations cannot be predicted, stations attempting meteor-scatter communications must transmit the same information repeatedly until an acknowledgement of reception from the other station is received. Established protocols are employed to regulate the progress of information flow between stations. While a single meteor may create an ion trail that supports several steps of the communication protocol, often a complete exchange of information requires several meteors and a long period of time to complete.

Any form of communications mode can be used for meteor-scatter communications. Single sideband audio transmission has been popular among amateur radio operators in North America attempting to establish contact with other stations during meteor showers without planning a schedule in advance with the other station. The use of Morse code has been more popular in Europe, where amateur radio operators used modified tape recorders, and later computer programs, to send messages at transmission speeds as high as 800 words per minute. Stations receiving these bursts of information record the signal and play it back at a slower speed to copy the content of the transmission. Since 2000, several digital modes implemented by computer programs have replaced voice and Morse code communications in popularity. The most popular mode for amateur radio operations is MSK144, which is implemented in the WSJT-X software.
