= Hulse–Taylor pulsar =

Pulsar in the constellation Aquila

Observation data Epoch B1950.0 Equinox ICRS
- Constellation: Aquila
- Right ascension: 19^{h} 13^{m} 12.4655^{s}
- Declination: +16° 01′ 08.189″

Astrometry
Distance	21,000 ly (6,400 pc)

Details
Mass	1.441 M_{☉}
Rotation	59.030003217813 ms

Other designations
- PSR B1913+16, PSR J1915+1606, Hulse–Taylor binary pulsar, Hulse–Taylor system, Hulse–Taylor binary, Hulse–Taylor pulsar, Hulse–Taylor PSR

Database references
SIMBAD	data

The Hulse–Taylor pulsar (known as PSR B1913+16, PSR J1915+1606 or PSR 1913+16) is a binary star system composed of a neutron star and a pulsar which orbit around their common center of mass. It is the first binary pulsar ever discovered.

The pulsar was discovered by Russell Alan Hulse and Joseph Hooton Taylor Jr., of the University of Massachusetts Amherst in 1974. Their discovery of the system and analysis of it earned them the 1993 Nobel Prize in Physics "for the discovery of a new type of pulsar, a discovery that has opened up new possibilities for the study of gravitation."

== Discovery ==
Using the Arecibo 305 m dish, Hulse and Taylor detected pulsed radio emissions and thus identified the source as a pulsar, a rapidly rotating, highly magnetized neutron star. The neutron star rotates on its axis 16.94 times per second; thus the pulse period is 59.03 milliseconds.

After timing the radio pulses for some time, Hulse and Taylor noticed that there was a systematic variation in the arrival time of the pulses. Sometimes, the pulses were received a little sooner than expected; sometimes, later than expected. These variations changed in a smooth and repetitive manner, with a period of 7.7519 hours. They realized that such behavior is predicted if the pulsar were in a binary orbit with another star, later confirmed to be another neutron star.

== Star system ==
The pulsar and its neutron star companion both follow elliptical orbits around their common center of mass. The period of the orbital motion is 7.7519 hours, and the two neutron stars are believed to be nearly equal in mass, about 1.4 solar masses. Radio emissions have been detected from only one of the two neutron stars.

The minimum separation at periastron is about 1.1 solar radii; the maximum separation at apastron is 4.8 solar radii. The orbit is inclined at about 45 degrees with respect to the plane of the sky. The orientation of periastron changes by about 4.2 degrees per year in direction of the orbital motion (relativistic precession of periastron). In January 1975, it was oriented so that periastron occurred perpendicular to the line of sight from Earth.

== Use as a test of general relativity ==
Evidence of orbital decay in PSR B1913+16. The data points indicate the observed change in the time of periastron with date, relative to a system not undergoing decay. The parabola illustrates the theoretically expected change according to general relativity.

The orbit has decayed since the binary system was initially discovered, in precise agreement with the loss of energy due to gravitational waves described by Albert Einstein's general theory of relativity. The ratio of observed to predicted rate of orbital decay is calculated to be 0.997 ± 0.002. The total power of the gravitational waves emitted by this system presently is calculated to be 7.35 × 10^{24} watts. For comparison, this is 1.9% of the power radiated in light by the Sun. The Solar System radiates only about 5,000 watts in gravitational waves, due to the much larger distances and orbit times, particularly between the Sun and Jupiter, and the relatively small mass of the planets.

With this comparatively large energy loss due to gravitational radiation, the rate of decrease of orbital period is 76.5 microseconds per year, the rate of decrease of semimajor axis is 3.5 meters per year, and the calculated lifetime to final inspiral is 300 million years.

In 2004, Taylor and Joel M. Weisberg published a new analysis of the experimental data to date, concluding that the 0.2% disparity between the data and the predicted results is due to poorly known galactic constants, including the Sun's distance from the Galactic Center, the pulsar's proper motion and its distance from Earth. While there are efforts underway for better measurement of the first two quantities, they saw "little prospect for a significant improvement in knowledge of the pulsar distance," so tighter bounds will be difficult to attain. Taylor and Weisberg also mapped the pulsar's two-dimensional beam structure using the fact that the system's precession leads to varying pulse shapes. They found that the beam shape is latitudinally elongated, and pinched longitudinally near the centre, leading to an overall shape like a figure eight.

In 2016, Weisberg and Huang published further results, still with a 0.16% disparity, finding that the ratio of the observed value compared to the predicted value was 0.9983 ± 0.0016. They name the main driver of this improvement, from 1.8σ to 1σ discrepancy, as being improved galactic constants published in 2014.

== Characteristics ==
- Mass of companion: 1.387 M_{☉}
- Total mass of the system: 2.828378(7) M_{☉}
- Orbital period: 7.751938773864 hr
- Eccentricity: 0.6171334
- Semi-major axis: 1,950,100 km
- Periastron separation: 746,600 km
- Apastron separation: 3,153,600 km
- Orbital velocity of stars at periastron (relative to center of mass): 450 km/s
- Orbital velocity of stars at apastron (relative to center of mass): 110 km/s

== See also ==
- Tests of general relativity
- Timeline of gravitational physics and relativity
