= Max Proebstl =

German opera singer

Max Proebstl (24 September 1913 – 19 November 1979) was a German opera and oratorio singer (bass).

== Life and career ==
Born in Munich, Proebstl studied at the Music Academy in his hometown with the famous bass singer Paul Bender. At the age of 28 he made his debut at the Stadttheater in Kaiserslautern. From 1942 to 1943 he was at the Stadttheater Augsburg and from 1943 to 1944 at the Theater Dortmund. Afterwards he was drafted for military service for a few months. In 1947 Proebstl returned to the music stage of Augsburg. He stayed there for two years and then went to the Bavarian State Opera as a permanent member of the ensemble, to which he belonged for more than 25 years.

Proebstl sang on almost all major opera stages of the German and English speaking countries. His roles included: Falstaff in the opera of the same name, Bartolo in The Barber of Seville, Osmin in Die Entführung aus dem Serail, Kasper in Der Freischütz, Antonio in Le Nozze di Figaro etc. Among his vocal partners were Erika Köth, Hertha Töpper, Irmgard Seefried, Hermann Prey, Fritz Wunderlich, Hans Hotter and Dietrich Fischer-Dieskau.

In 1957 the artist played Count Starhemberg at the Bavarian State Opera in the world premiere of Hindemith's opera Die Harmonie der Welt. He was also a concert and oratorio singer. From 1961 to 1967, for example, he appeared at the Salzburg Festival in Beethoven's Oratorio Christus am Ölberge.

Proebstl died in Munich at age 66.

== Bibliography ==
- Karl-Josef Kutsch, Leo Riemens: Großes Sängerlexikon. Second volume: M–Z. Stuttgart 1987, p. 2368–2369.
