= Chandler Metropolitan Sedan =

Vehicle manufactured by the Chandler Motor Car Company

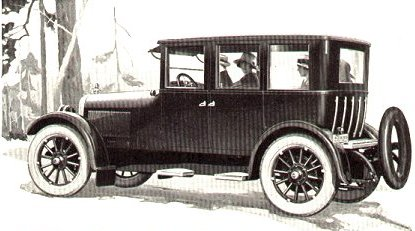

The Chandler Metropolitan Sedan was manufactured by the Chandler Motor Car Company of Cleveland, Ohio.

== Chandler Metropolitan Sedan specifications (1926 data) ==
- Color – Two-tone brown or Sagebrush green
- Seating Capacity – Five
- Wheelbase – 123 inches
- Wheels - Wood
- Tires - 33” × 6” balloon
- Service Brakes - contracting on rear wheels
- Emergency Brakes – contracting on transmission
- Engine - Six-cylinder, vertical, cast en bloc, 3 1/2 × 5 inches; head removable; valves in side; H.P. 29.4 N.A.C.C. rating
- Lubrication – Force feed
- Crankshaft - Four bearing
- Radiator – Cellular
- Cooling – Water pump
- Ignition –Storage battery
- Starting System – Two Unit
- Voltage – Six to eight
- Wiring System – Single
- Gasoline System – Vacuum
- Clutch – Dry disc
- Transmission – Constant mesh
- Gear Changes – 3 forward, 1 reverse
- Drive – Spiral bevel
- Rear Springs – Semi-elliptic
- Rear Axle – Three-quarter floating
- Steering Gear – Worm and gear

=== Standard equipment ===
New car price included the following items:

- tools
- jack
- speedometer
- ammeter
- motometer
- electric horn
- transmission theft lock
- automatic windshield cleaner
- demountable rims
- spare tire carrier
- cowl ventilator
- headlight dimmer
- closed cars have dome light, sun visor, and rear-view mirror.

=== Optional equipment ===
The following was available at an extra cost:

- Front Brakes

=== Prices ===
New car prices were available upon application on the following models:

- Two Passenger Roadster
- Four Passenger Royal Dispatch
- Five Passenger Touring
- Seven Passenger Touring
- Five Passenger Coach Imperial
- Five Passenger Chummy Sedan
- Five Passenger, Four-door Sedan
- Five Passenger Metropolitan Sedan
- Seven Passenger Sedan
- Seven Passenger Limousine

== See also ==
- Chandler Motor Car
