= Die Harmonie der Welt Symphony =

1951 symphony by Paul Hindemith

- by Paul Hindemith
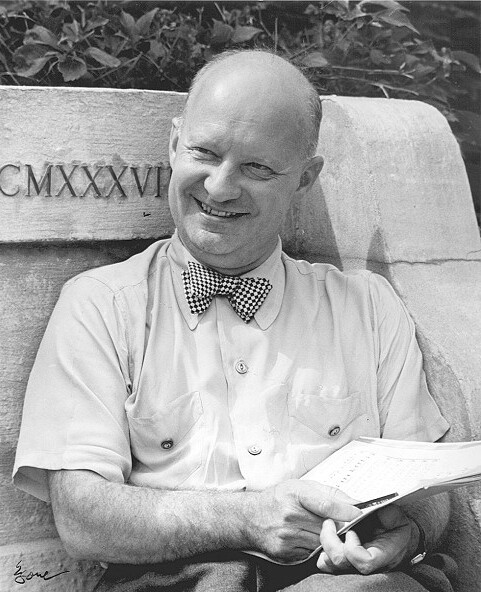
- Paul Hindemith
- Catalogue: IPH 50
- Composed: 1951
- Dedication: Paul Sacher
- Performed: 25 January 1952, Basel
- Published: 1952
- Duration: 34 minutes
- Movements: 3
- Scoring: Large orchestra

Die Harmonie der Welt Symphony (originally entitled Symphonie „Die Harmonie der Welt“ in German), IPH 50, is a symphony by German composer Paul Hindemith composed in 1951, which served as the basis for his opera Die Harmonie der Welt.

== Composition ==
This symphony was created out of Hindemith's fascination with the life of astronomer Johannes Kepler, and the title is a German translation of Kepler's Harmonices Mundi (1619), famous for explaining Kepler's Third Law of Planetary Motion. In this book, Kepler also explored theories of physical harmonies in the movement of the planets and provided a scientific explanation for the idea of the Harmony of the Spheres. Though it might have seemed far-fetched, Hindemith was fascinated by the mystical side of it, which is an aspect of his creativity that is often shown in other great works by the composer.

Hindemith started thinking of writing an opera about Johannes Kepler in 1939, and he kept mentioning the project in his letters throughout the war years. Hindemith probably created full structures and portions of the opera before he began writing them on paper. However, in 1951, the composer offered Paul Sacher the premiere of a "preview suite" of his future opera to celebrate the 25th anniversary of the Basel Chamber Orchestra.

The symphony was written for Paul Sacher and was first performed in Basel on 25 January 1952 by an expanded Basel Chamber Orchestra under the baton of Sacher. Even though Hindemith had stated on more than one occasion that the symphony was drawn from musical fragments of the opera of the same name, the opera would not be completed until 1957, six years later than the symphony's date of completion. In fact, Hindemith only began a serious endeavour to complete the libretto for the five-act opera in 1955, which he finished on 1 September 1956. This was also the case of some of Hindemith's other symphonies, such as his Symphony: Mathis der Maler, which was also finished years prior to the opera's completion, and Nobilissima Visione, a ballet which was reworked as a short three-movement suite. This symphony was published the year it was premiered, on 30 October 1952, by Schott Music.

== Structure ==
The symphony is divided into three movements, each of which has an approximate duration of 10 to 12 minutes. The movement list is as follows:

1. Musica instrumentalis (Instrumental Music)
2. Musica humana (Human Music)
3. Musica mundana (Music of the World)

The Latin titles of the three movements are based on Boethius's three kinds of music: the music made by instrumentalists and singers, the harmony between the human body and soul, and the consonance that reigns in the whole divinely created world. For this reason, the movements are not based upon dramatic events taking place in the opera, but rather the different ways in which humankind can experience universal consonance.

The musica instrumentalis begins with the overture used in the opera and is quickly followed by the march that opens act 2 and, later on, the refrain and first episode in the witch-trial scene. The music used in the second movement is extracted from act 2 of the opera, where Kepler, speaking to his future wife, expresses his gratitude for her confidence. This is followed by the scene in which Kepler and Susanna talk about their shared creed and the basis of their marriage. After this, a very short contrasting passage with a dance in 3/4 and a violin solo leads to the 28 bars that would become the end of act 2. The third movement has music that is used in the final segment of act 5. Hindemith only added vocal lines to the orchestral texture, as well as interpolating a few recitativic inserts. The tempo markings are in German and are generally slow and reflective. However, each movement is formed by an amalgamation of short segments, which is why the symphony includes many different tempo changes.

The symphony is scored for a large orchestra made up of two flutes, two oboes, two clarinets in B♭, a bass clarinet, two bassoons, a contrabassoon, four horns in F, two trumpets in Bb, three trombones, one tuba, timpani, a large percussion section (a bass drum, a tenor drum, a wooden drum, a snare drum, cymbals, a triangle, a tambourine, a tam-tam, a gong, tubular bells, and a glockenspiel) calling for three to five percussionists and a large string section.

== Reception ==
Wilhelm Furtwängler declared that Die Harmonie der Welt Symphony was the composer's best orchestral composition and immediately included it in his repertoire.
