= Chandler Motor Car =

American automobile manufacturer 1913-1929

Chandler radiator emblem

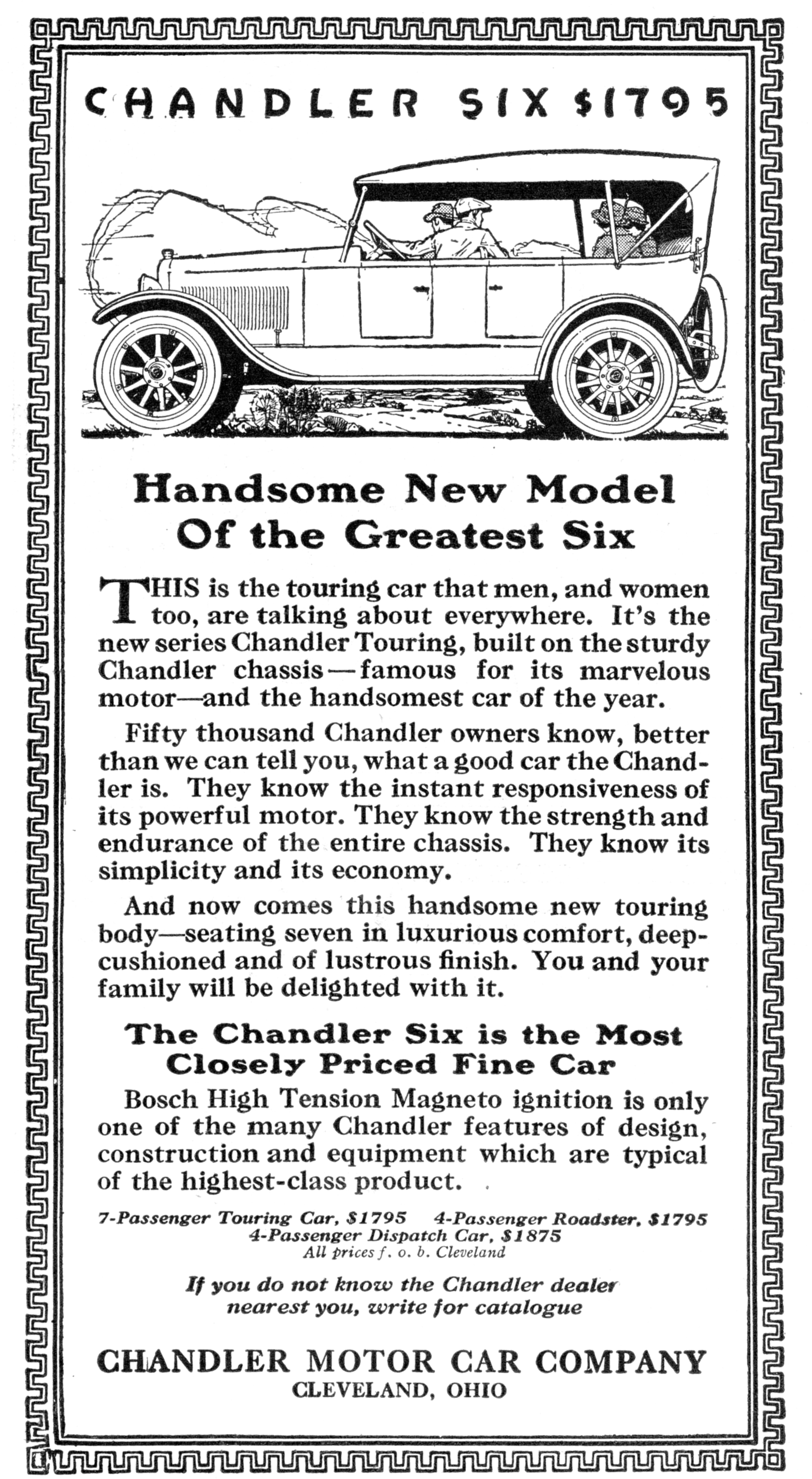
1919 advertisement for the Chandler Motor Car company

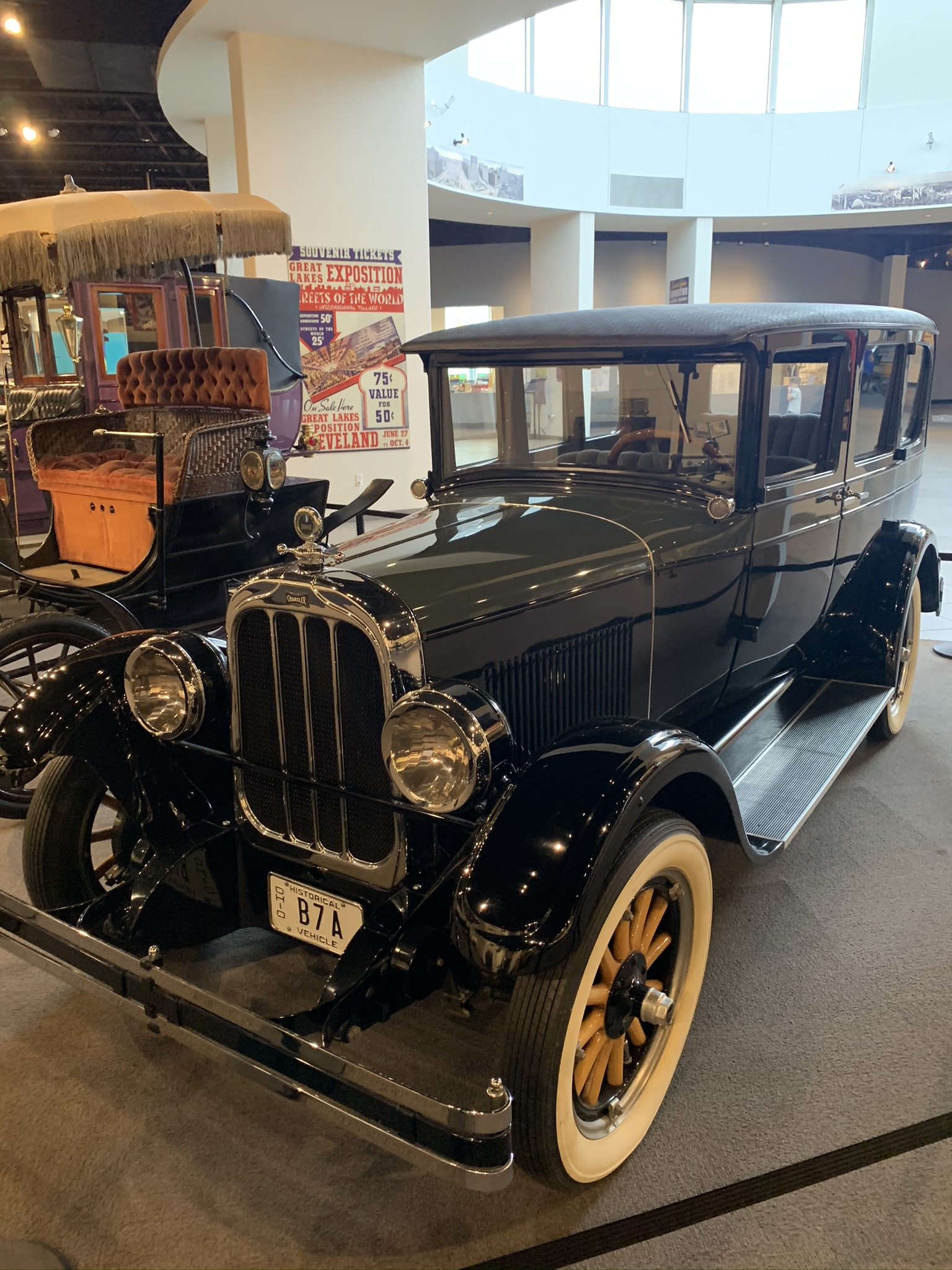
1927 Chandler

The Chandler Motor Car Company produced automobiles in the United States of America during the 1910s and 1920s.

== Corporate strategy ==
Chandler was incorporated in 1913, with Frederick C. Chandler as President, headquartered and with its factory in Cleveland, Ohio. Chandler was a former designer for the Lozier Motor Company, a top end luxury automobile manufacturer. Chandler and several other Lozier executives left the company to form his company.

Chandler concentrated on producing a good quality motor-car within the price range of middle class Americans. Chandlers were well received in the marketplace.

== Production ==
In 1920, Chandler had a line of six cars, ranging from $1995 to $3595. This grew to 10 by 1922, ranging from $1495 to $2375. Like many other medium-price carmakers, in the middle 1920s Chandler introduced a lower-priced "companion car" called the Cleveland. In 1924, they introduced the "Traffic Transmission," a constant-mesh gearbox that reduced the need for extra clutching when downshifting. This was several years before General Motors offered the "Synchro-Mesh" transmission, which allowed the driver to shift into first gear while moving forward at low speeds.

Chandler's peak year was 1927, when they sold 20,000 cars. Hopes for continued growth of the market led to overexpansion by the company the following year, which finished 1928 over half a million dollars in debt.

In 1929, Chandler Motor Company was purchased by its expanding competitor Hupp Motor Car Company for its factory and manufacturing facilities, and the brand was discontinued.

Chandler, like most cars built before all-steel bodies became the industry standard in the mid-1930s, used bodies built with a metal skin around a wooden frame (an "armored wood" frame). Due to the use of fabric roofs, after a few decades the wood tended to rot; because of this Chandlers have survived in smaller numbers than some other popular automobiles of the era that used all-steel bodies.

Chandler Motor Car models

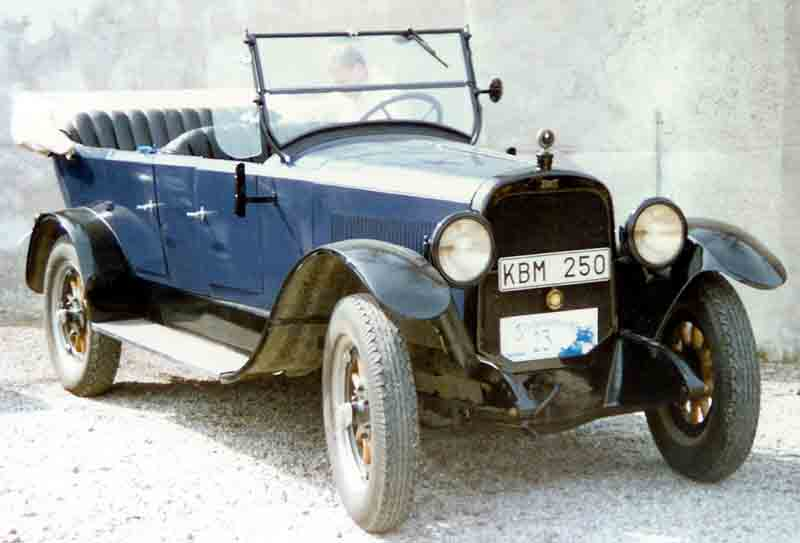
Chandler Light Weight Model 19 Touring 1919

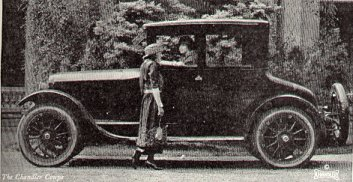
1920 Chandler Coupe, retailing for $3095 new

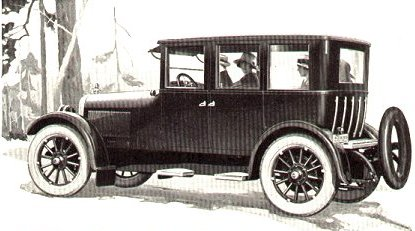
Chandler Metropolitan Sedan, 1922, retailing for $2295

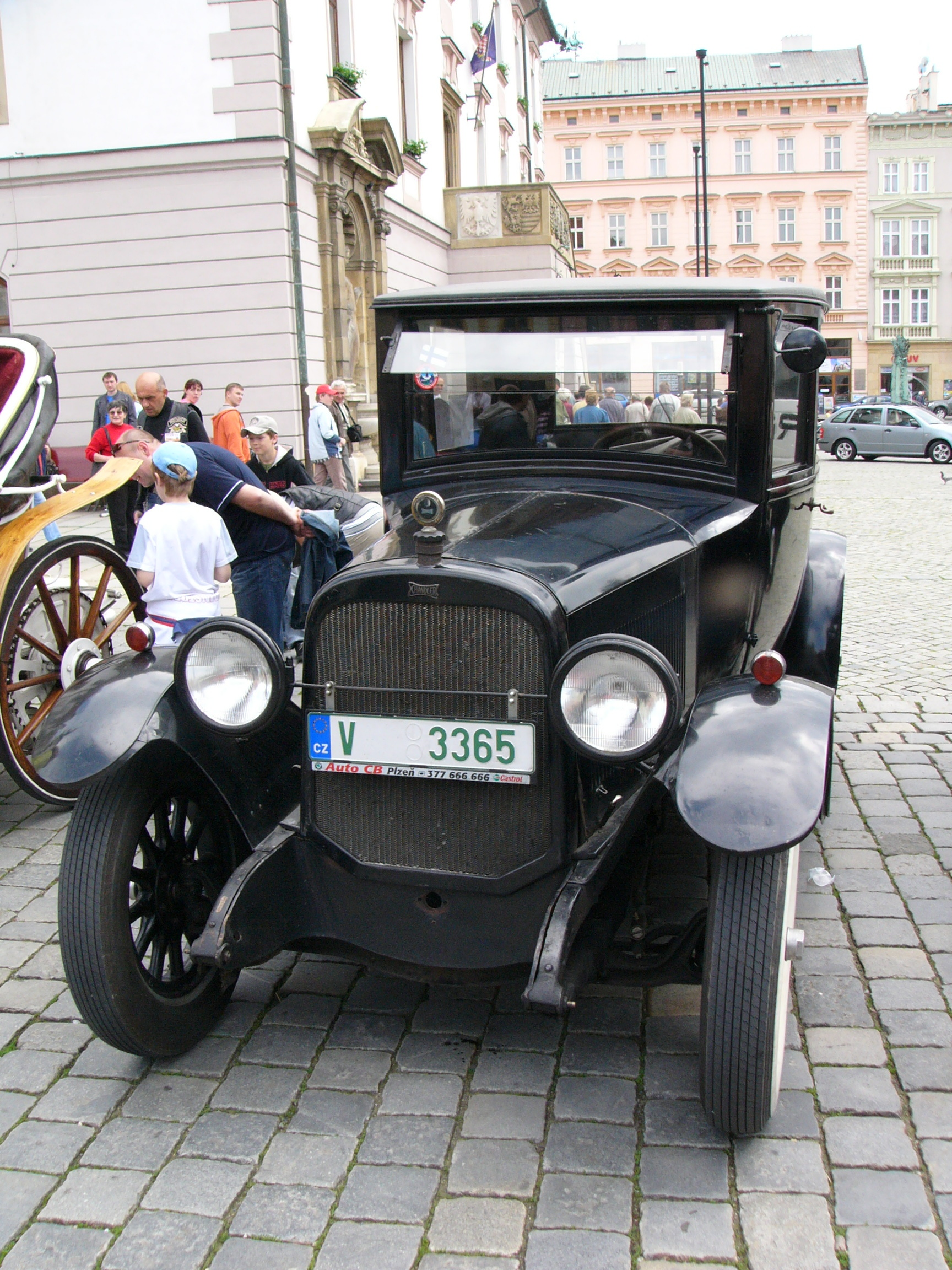
Chandler Opera Coupe, 1919, series 27

Year	Production	Model
1914	2730	14
1915	3890	15
1916	3910	16
1917	3515	17
1918	3460	18
1919	3670	19
1920	4773	20
1921	5783	21
1922	6870	22
1923	11212	23
1924	10416	32-A
1925	10416	33; 35
1926	20268	33; 35
1927	18461	Standard Six; Special Six; Royal Eight
1928	15530	
1929	7613	Royal 85
Sum	132.517	

== Production models ==
- Chandler Light Weight Model 19 Touring 1919
- Chandler Metropolitan Sedan, 1922
