= Katharina Kepler =

German woman accused of witchcraft, mother of astronomer Johannes Kepler

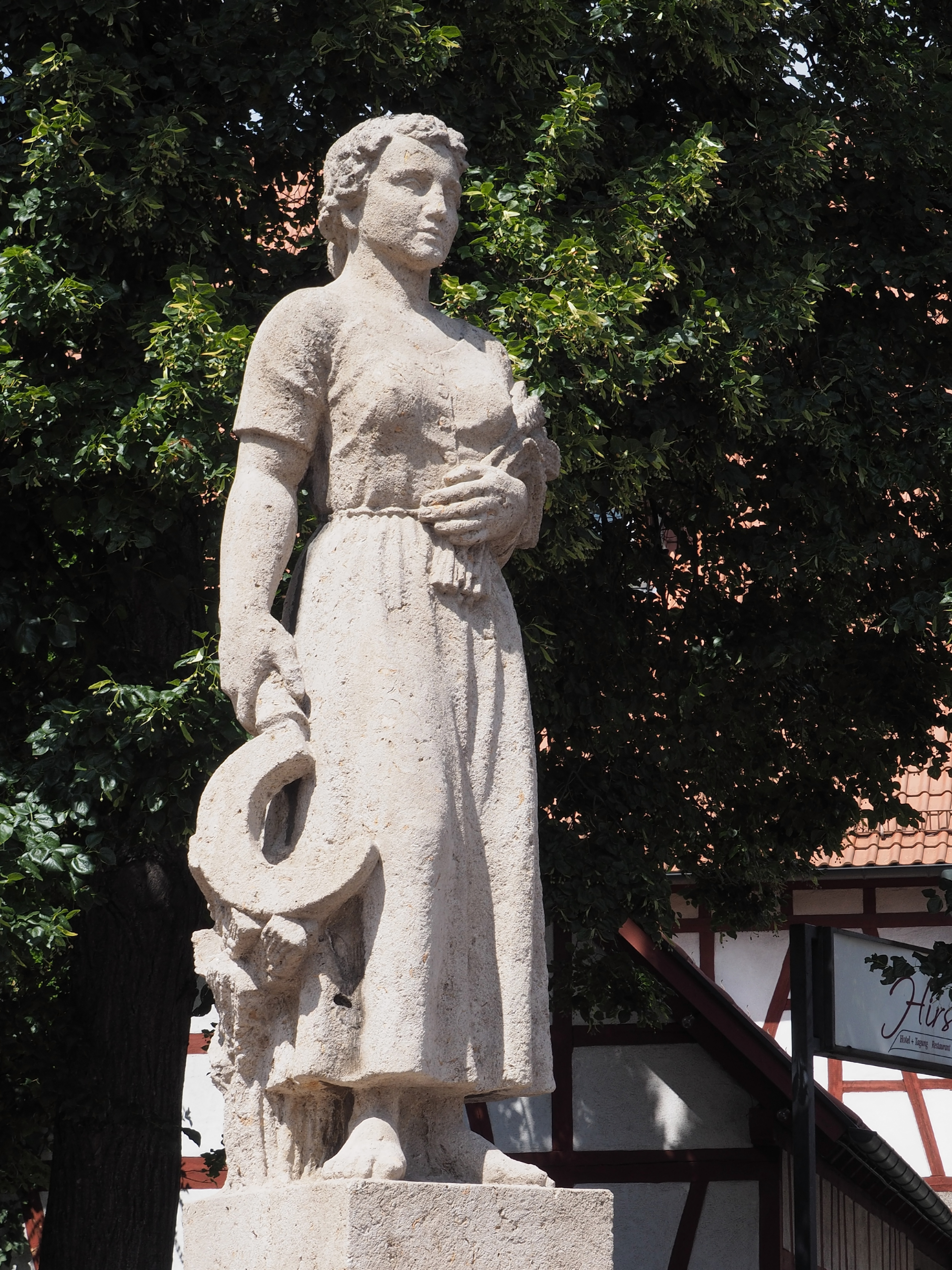
- Statue woman with sickle (1937) in Leonberg, Baden-Württemberg, Germany, dedicated to Katharina Kepler
- Born: Katharina Guldenmann; 8 November 1547; Leonberg
- Died: 13 April 1622 (aged 74); Roßwälden
- Citizenship: Duchy of Württemberg, (Holy Roman Empire)
- Occupations: restaurateur, healer, herbalist

Katharina Kepler (née: Guldenmann; 8 November 1547 – 13 April 1622) was a German herbalist from Leonberg, Württemberg, who was the mother of the famous astronomer Johannes Kepler. She was accused of witchcraft in 1615 and again in 1620, but was defended by her son and released.

== Life ==
Katharina grew up in Eltingen. Her father Melchior Guldenmann was an innkeeper and became Schultheiss (mayor, until 1587) of the town when she was 20 years old. She had a female cousin who was burned as a "witch" in Weil der Stadt. Katharina was raised by her parents in the Lutheran faith. Because of her mother's illness, she did not have an easy childhood. She worked in her parents' inn until she got married.

After her husband's death around 1590, Katharina Kepler inherited a house as well as fields and meadows. In 1598 she and her family moved into a small winegrower's house in Leonberg. After the death of her father, who had lived with her for several years and had been cared for by her (in his will he thanked her for the selfless five-year care), Katharina Kepler inherited money. As a single widow, she was financially independent and could support herself and her children. After her youngest children moved out, Katharina lived alone in Leonberg. In 1614, she was listed in the tax register as a tax-paying independent citizen.

=== Persecution as a witch ===
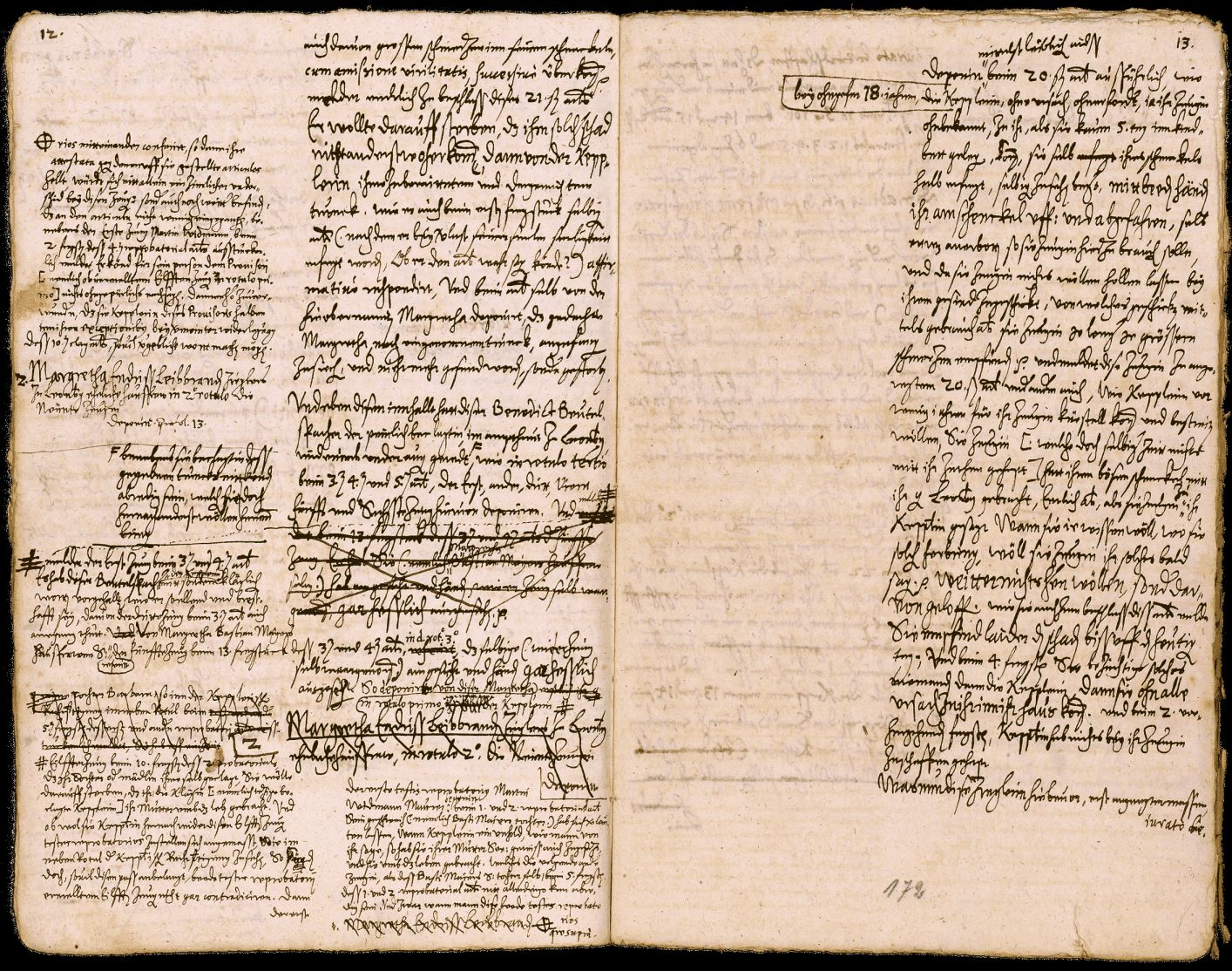
Witness testimony from the witch trial against Katharina Kepler, 14 July 1621

In 1615, Ursula Reinbold, the wife of a glazier, accused Katharina after a business dispute with her of having given her a bitter drink that had made her ill, and she reported Katharina to the ducal sub-bailiff of the Leonberg office, demanding compensation for the pain she had suffered. A witch trial was initiated by Lutherus Einhorn who in his reign as Vogt of the Protestant town of Leonberg (1613–1629) accused fifteen women of sorcery and executed eight of them by burning. He acted in accordance with the will of the government and the public, which had asked for an investigation of sorcery, and issued an arrest of Katharina Kepler in 1615. Johannes Kepler defended his mother himself, he had sought advice with the assistance from lawyers and theologians of his university of Tübingen. One of his student friends, Christopher Besoldus, assisted her juridically.

Her son took her away to Linz in December 1616. When she returned to Leonberg in the summer of 1620, she was arrested and imprisoned for fourteen months. Katharina Kepler was arrested on 7 August 1620 in the parsonage in Heumaden and taken to Güglingen. The scrupulous court hearing took place on 20 August 1621. According to the record, Katharina Kepler appeared "unfortunately with the assistance of her son Johann Kepler, Mathematici." Two strong men guarded the 73-year-old woman day and night. The accused and her relatives had to pay the costs. She was in chains for fourteen months.

She was told how she would be tortured, as a means of frightening her, but she refused to confess anything. When she was finally shown the instruments of torture in order to force her to confess, she remained steadfast: "She said that they could do whatever they wanted with her, and even if they pulled out every vein from her body, she would still have nothing to confess ... she would also want to die on that; God would reveal after her death that injustice and violence had been done to her."

=== Release and death ===
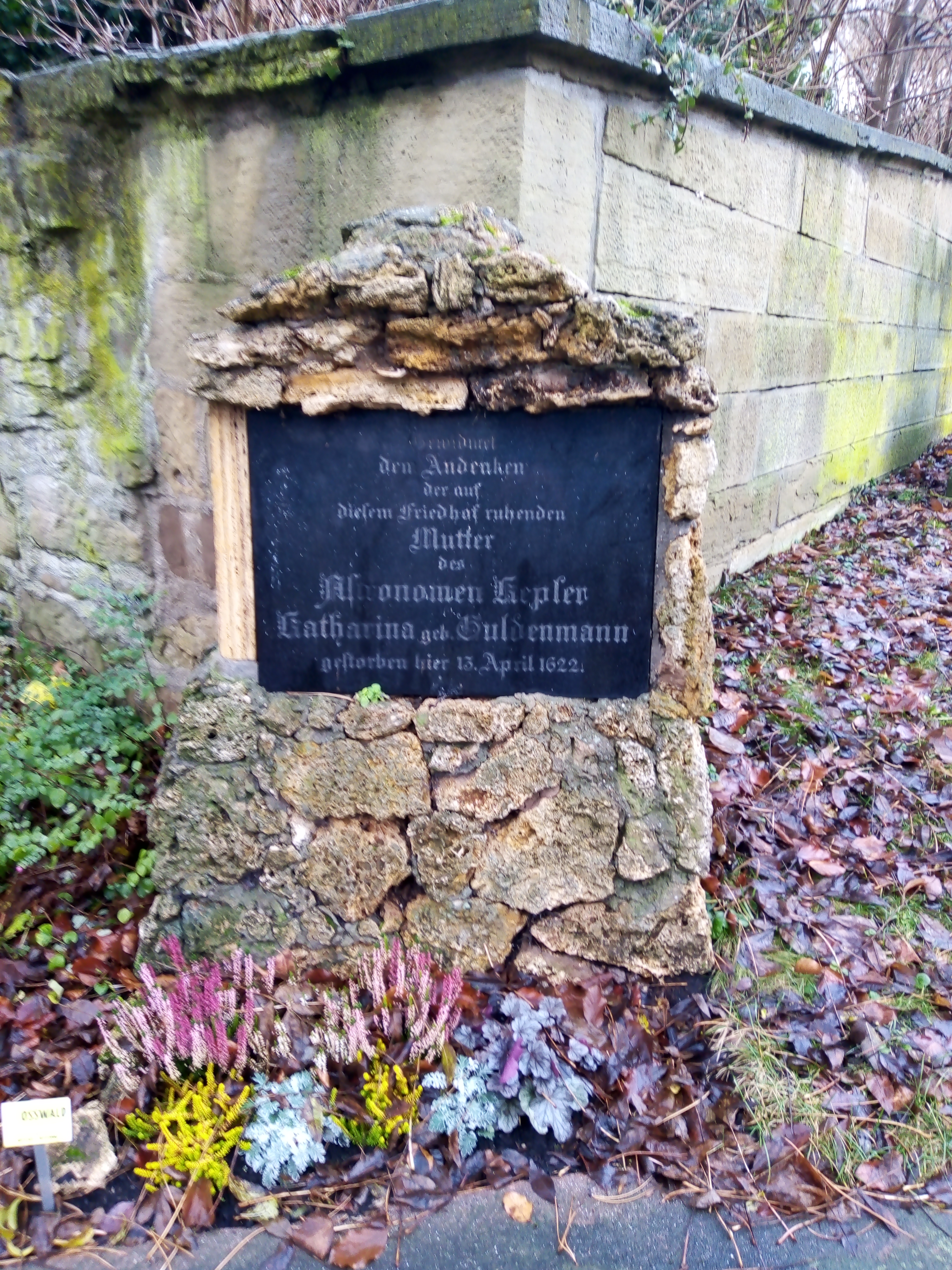
Memorial stone dedicated to the mother of the astronomer Kepler, Katharina née Guldenmann, who rests in the cemetery Seestr., Leonberg

This ultimately led to an acquittal. A week after her torture she was released in 1621 after 405 days of pretrial detention. The trial cost Johannes Kepler over 900 guilders (more than two years' salary) because the costs were artificially inflated by delays in the trial, excessive costs for heating, food, and two guards.

Katharina Kepler died about six months later.

The senior councillor of the princely chancellery in Stuttgart drew his lesson from the case. Just a few weeks after Katharina's acquittal, he prohibited the arbitrary delay of proceedings and the taking of action against suspects without his knowledge and consent.

== Legacy ==
Although the witch trial against Katharina Kepler was one of the best-documented cases in Germany, it has historically received little academic attention. For a long time, Katharina Kepler was portrayed as an old, witch-like woman. Historian Ulinka Rublack's biography, "The Astronomer and the Witch," changed that. Her work profoundly revised the previous view and offered a new perspective on the Kepler case. According to Rublack, the Vogt of Leonberg ignored legal requirements from the beginning and acted according to his own interests. Kepler's defense was groundbreaking in that, it followed the legal arguments of moderate legal scholars on witch hunts and took all the details into account.

The municipality of Eltingen erected in 2022 a memorial in Carl-Schmincke-Str. in memory of Katharina Kepler.

== In popular culture ==
- Katharina Kepler is one of the main characters in Paul Hindemith's opera Die Harmonie der Welt (premiered in 1957).
- Kepler is an opera by Philip Glass at the Landestheater Linz with Dennis Russell Davies conducting the Bruckner Orchestra Linz; it premiered on 20 September 2009.
- In 2017, Helmut Jasbar incorporated the story of Katharina and Johannes Kepler in the musical story Eternity for Beginners.
- In 2021, the musical opera Katharina Kepler, which revolves around her witch trial, premiered in Pforzheim. The Pforzheim Theater commissioned the opera from the composer Volker M. Plangg.
- Rivka Galchen's 2021 novel Everyone Knows Your Mother Is a Witch presents a fictionalized account of Kepler's life story.

== Literature ==
- Ulinka Rublack (2017). The Astronomer and the Witch: Johannes Kepler's Fight for His Mother. Oxford University Press. ISBN 978-0-19-873678-3.
- James A. Connor (2009). Kepler's Witch – An Astronomer's Discovery of Cosmic Order Amid Religious War, Political Intrigue, and the Heresy Trial of His Mother. Harper Collins. p. 402. ISBN 978-0-06-173742-8.
- Kurt Baschwitz: Hexen und Hexenprozesse, C. Bertelsmann Verlag, München, 1990, pages 252–260, in German
- Berthold Sutter: Der Hexenprozeß gegen Katharina Kepler, Weil der Stadt, Kepler-Ges., 1979, in German
- Helene Cixous Well Kept Ruins 2022 -- Katarina Kepler pp 92-93
