= Everyone Knows Your Mother Is a Witch =

2021 novel by Rivka Galchen

- 2021 book cover image
- Author: Rivka Galchen
- Audio read by: Natasha Soudek
- Genre: Fiction, Historical novel
- Set in: 17th-century Germany
- Publisher: Farrar, Straus and Giroux
- Publication date: June 8, 2021
- Publication place: United States
- Media type: Hardcover, E-book, Audio book
- Pages: 288
- ISBN: 9780374280468
- OCLC: 1269024553
- LC Class: PS3607.A4116 E94 2021
- Preceded by: 'Atmospheric Disturbances'
- Website: Macmillan

Everyone Knows Your Mother Is a Witch is a historical fiction novel written by Rivka Galchen and published by Farrar, Straus and Giroux on June 8, 2021. The book is a fictionalized version of true events. Part of the historical background of this story is that "between 1625 and 1631, under the Catholic Prince-Bishopric of Würzburg, the Holy Roman Empire saw one of the biggest mass trials in European history, with an estimated 900 people executed in the Würzburg witch trials."

== Plot ==
This story is set in the 17th century in the Holy Roman Empire during the beginnings of the Thirty Years War and the plague. In this fictionalized version of the illiterate Katharina Kepler's later life, she is accused of witchcraft. Part of the reason for the accusation is because she lives into old age when most people die around the age of 30. Other reasons are related to her personal quirks. Also, the label of "witch" comes at first from Ursula Reinbold and then snowballs into many in her community accusing her of the same. Her son Johannes Kepler was compelled to absent himself from the royal court to defend his mother. She is also aided by two of her other children as well as her sympathetic legal guardian, scribe, and neighbor, Simon.

== Reception ==
Kirkus Reviews says, "There is so much in this novel to consider—the degree to which we make monsters of one another, the way that old age can make of femininity an apparently terrifying, otherworldly thing—but it is also, at every step along the way, an entirely delicious book." Publishers Weekly says, "Galchen portrays her characters as complicated and full of wit as they face down the cruelties dealt to them...[t]his is a resounding delight. According to Rhianna Walton of Powell's Books, "It's relatable, in a way I didn't think possible...[a]nd it's poignant and philosophical, an examination of motherhood, neighborhood, science, magic, and culpability that I knew possible only because I've read Galchen before and was prepared for her singular ability to breathe life, logic, and beauty into the absurd. Writing for The Washington Post, Ron Charles describes how "the comedy that runs through 'Everyone Knows' is a magical brew of absurdity and brutality. Galchen has a Kafkaesque sense of the way the exercise of authority inflates egos and twists logic."

The novel was long listed for the 2022 Canada Reads contest.
