= Erwin Staudt =

German football club president

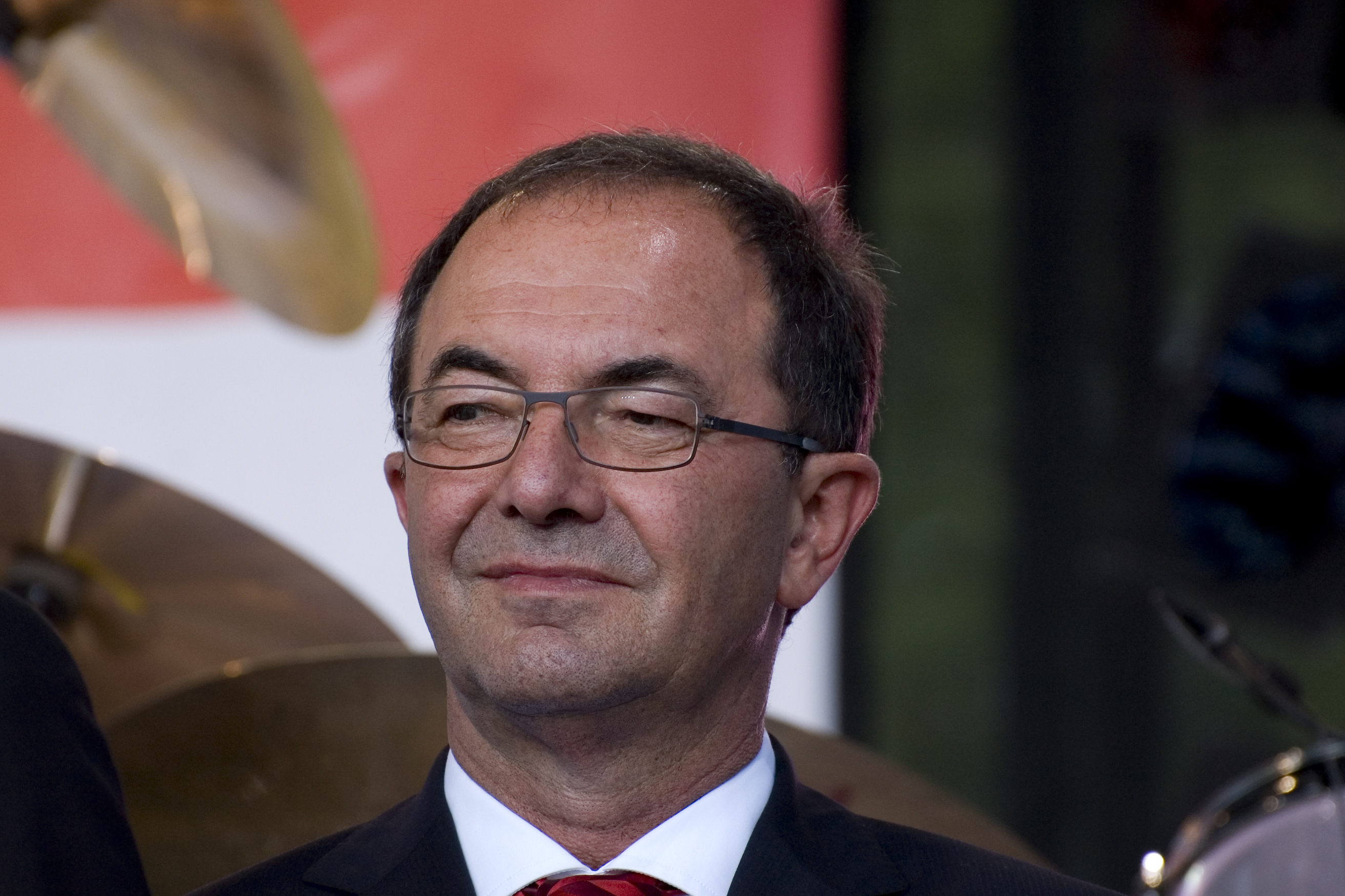
Erwin Staudt

Erwin Staudt (born February 25, 1948, in Leonberg) is a former president of VfB Stuttgart. Staudt had studied economy and was manager at IBM.

He was elected as president of VfB Stuttgart on 26 June 2003. On 17 July 2011 he did not participate again in the election of the president.

== Career at IBM ==
Staudt joined in IBM Germany in 1973. In 1982, he took his first job in Stuttgart as a manager, where he worked as Sales Manager in charge of the Baden-Württemberg customers in the areas of Financial Management, Social and Energy Supply. Later he held the positions of Head of Marketing in the head office as well as the Assistant Director of Marketing and Services.

1986 Staudt became head of the Berlin branch of IBM, 1989, he took over as Executive Vice President as Head of Communications / Public Relations at the headquarters of IBM Germany. From July 1992, he was responsible for the entire German PC business.

In 1994 Staudt changed his position to Sales and was appointed to CEO of IBM Germany Informationssysteme GmbH.

In October 1994, Staudt went as General Manager for Competitive Marketing, then as Vice President of marketing to the European headquarters of IBM in Paris. He was responsible for the global operations "basic industries" and "Petroleum" from July 1995 to October 1998. From November 1, 1998, to January 14, 2003, Erwin Staudt was the CEO of IBM Germany.
