= Harmonice Mundi =

1619 book by Johannes Kepler

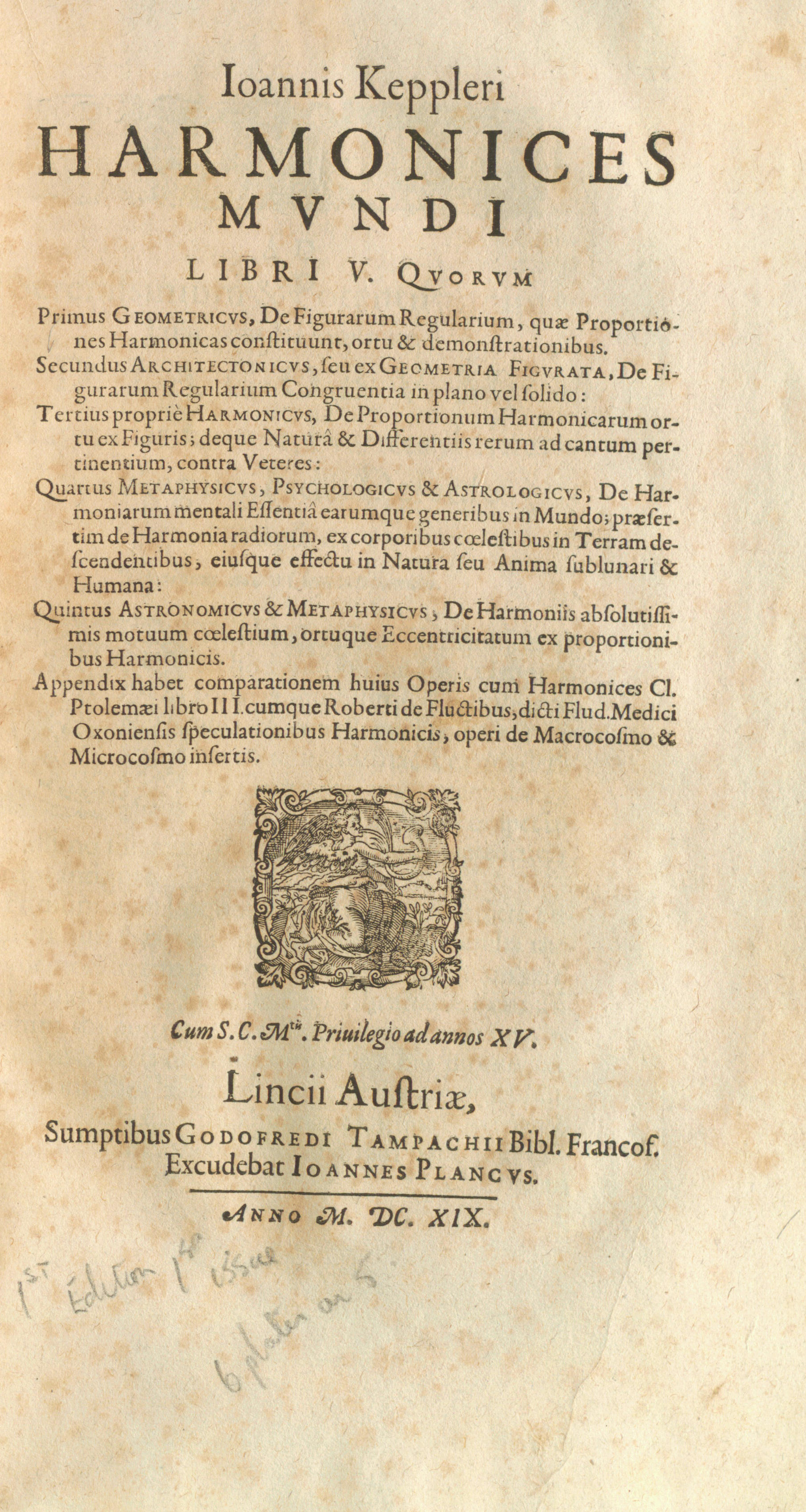
- 1619 first edition
- Author: Johannes Kepler
- Language: Latin
- Subject: Astronomy, Music
- Publisher: Linz
- Publication date: 1619

Harmonice Mundi (Latin: The Harmony of the World, 1619) is a book by Johannes Kepler. In the work, written entirely in Latin, Kepler discusses harmony and congruence in geometrical forms and physical phenomena. The final section of the work relates his discovery of the so-called third law of planetary motion.

The full title is Harmonices mundi libri V (The Five Books of The Harmony of the World), which is commonly but ungrammatically shortened to Harmonices mundi.

== Background and history ==
Kepler began working on Harmonice Mundi around 1599, which was the year Kepler sent a letter to Michael Maestlin detailing the mathematical data and proofs that he intended to use for his upcoming text, which he originally planned to name De harmonia mundi. Kepler was aware that the content of Harmonice Mundi closely resembled that of the subject matter for Ptolemy's Harmonica, but was not concerned. The new astronomy Kepler would use (most notably the adoption of elliptic orbits in the Copernican system) allowed him to explore new theorems. Another important development that allowed Kepler to establish his celestial-harmonic relationships was the abandonment of the Pythagorean tuning as the basis for musical consonance and the adoption of geometrically supported musical ratios; this would eventually be what allowed Kepler to relate musical consonance and the angular velocities of the planets. Thus, Kepler could reason that his relationships gave evidence for God acting as a grand geometer, rather than a Pythagorean numerologist.

The concept of musical harmonies intrinsically existing within the spacing of the planets existed in medieval philosophy prior to Kepler. Musica universalis was a traditional philosophical metaphor that was taught in the quadrivium, and was often called the "music of the spheres." Kepler was intrigued by this idea while he sought explanation for a rational arrangement of the heavenly bodies. When Kepler uses the term "harmony" it is not strictly referring to the musical definition, but rather a broader definition encompassing congruence in Nature and the workings of both the celestial and terrestrial bodies. He notes musical harmony as being a product of man, derived from angles, in contrast to a harmony that he refers to as being a phenomenon that interacts with the human soul. In turn, this allowed Kepler to claim the Earth has a soul because it is subjected to astrological harmony.

While writing the book, Kepler had to defend his mother in court after she had been accused of witchcraft.

== Content ==
Kepler divides The Harmony of the World into five long chapters: the first is on regular polygons; the second is on the congruence of figures; the third is on the origin of harmonic proportions in music; the fourth is on harmonic configurations in astrology; the fifth is on the harmony of the motions of the planets.

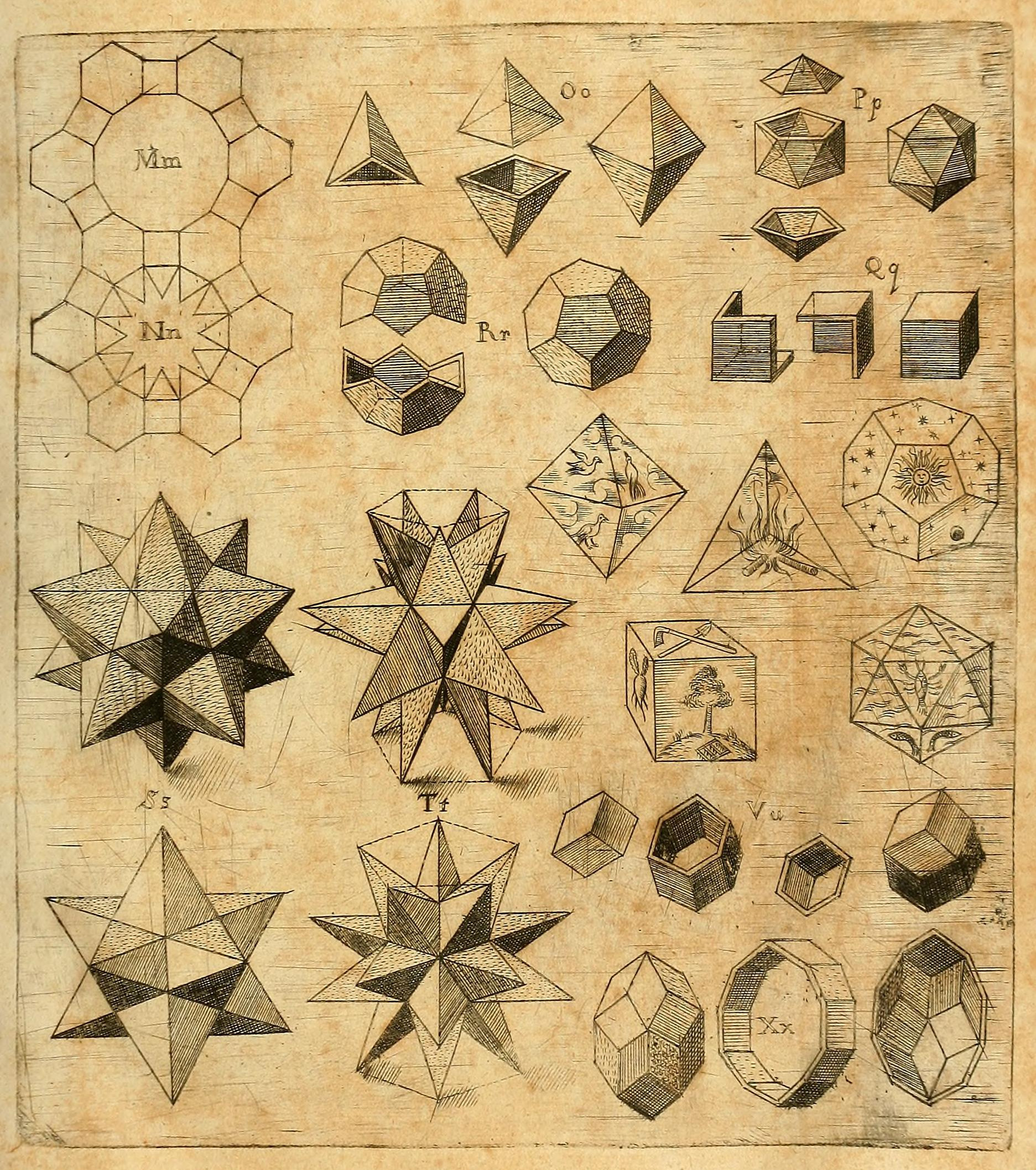
Page with geometric illustrations, including a truncated trihexagonal tiling, the stellated dodecahedra (small and great) and the Platonic solids assigned to elements.

=== Chapter 1 and 2 ===
Chapters 1 and 2 of The Harmony of the World contain most of Kepler's contributions concerning polyhedra. He is primarily interested with how polygons, which he defines as either regular or semiregular, can come to be fixed together around a central point on a plane to form congruence. His primary objective was to be able to rank polygons based on a measure of sociability, or rather, their ability to form partial congruence when combined with other polyhedra. He returns to this concept later in Harmonice Mundi with relation to astronomical explanations. In the second chapter is the earliest mathematical understanding of two types of regular star polyhedra, the small and great stellated dodecahedron; they would later be called Kepler's solids or Kepler Polyhedra and, together with two regular polyhedra discovered by Louis Poinsot, as the Kepler–Poinsot polyhedra. He describes polyhedra in terms of their faces, which is similar to the model used in Plato's Timaeus to describe the formation of Platonic solids in terms of basic triangles. The book features illustrations of solids and tiling patterns, some of which are related to the golden ratio.

While medieval philosophers spoke metaphorically of the "music of the spheres", Kepler discovered physical harmonies in planetary motion. He found that the difference between the maximum and minimum angular speeds of a planet in its orbit approximates a harmonic proportion. For instance, the maximum angular speed of the Earth as measured from the Sun varies by a semitone (a ratio of 16:15), from mi to fa, between aphelion and perihelion. Venus only varies by a tiny 25:24 interval (called a diesis in musical terms). Kepler explains the reason for the Earth's small harmonic range:

The Earth sings Mi, Fa, Mi: you may infer even from the syllables that in this our home misery and famine hold sway.

The celestial choir Kepler formed was made up of a tenor (Mars), two bass (Saturn and Jupiter), a soprano (Mercury), and two altos (Venus and Earth). Mercury, with its large elliptical orbit, was determined to be able to produce the greatest number of notes, while Venus was found to be capable of only a single note because its orbit is nearly a circle. At very rare intervals all of the planets would sing together in "perfect concord": Kepler proposed that this may have happened only once in history, perhaps at the time of creation. Kepler reminds us that harmonic order is only mimicked by man, but has origin in the alignment of the heavenly bodies:

Accordingly you won't wonder any more that a very excellent order of sounds or pitches in a musical system or scale has been set up by men, since you see that they are doing nothing else in this business except to play the apes of God the Creator and to act out, as it were, a certain drama of the ordination of the celestial movements.

— Book V

Kepler discovers that all but one of the ratios of the maximum and minimum speeds of planets on neighboring orbits approximate musical harmonies within a margin of error of less than a diesis (a 25:24 interval). The orbits of Mars and Jupiter produce the one exception to this rule, creating the inharmonic ratio of 18:19.

=== Chapter 5 ===
Chapter 5 includes a long digression on astrology. This is immediately followed by Kepler's third law of planetary motion, which shows a constant proportionality between the cube of the semi-major axis of a planet's orbit and the square of the time of its orbital period. Kepler's previous book, Astronomia nova, related the discovery of the first two principles now known as Kepler's laws.

== Recent history ==
A copy of the 1619 edition was stolen from the National Library of Sweden in the 1990s.

== Use in recent music ==
A small number of recent compositions either make reference to or are based on the concepts of Harmonice Mundi or Harmony of the Spheres. The most notable of these are:

- Laurie Spiegel: Kepler's Harmony of the Worlds (1977). An excerpt of the piece was selected by Carl Sagan for inclusion on the Voyager Golden Record, launched aboard the Voyager spacecraft.
- Mike Oldfield, (English musician and composer, born 1953), Music of the Spheres (album released in 2008 by Mercury Records).
- Joep Franssens (Dutch composer, born 1955), Harmony of the Spheres (cycle in five movements for mixed choir and string orchestra), composed 2001.
- Philip Glass, American composer, Kepler opera (2009), homage to Johannes Kepler, commissioned by the city of Linz, where the astronomer lived.
- Tim Watts, (English composer, born 1979), Kepler's Trial (2016–2017), premiered at St John's College, Cambridge (2016); revised version performed at the Victoria and Albert Museum, 9 November 2017
- Paul Hindemith, German composer, Die Harmonie der Welt Symphony (originally entitled Symphonie „Die Harmonie der Welt“ in German), IPH 50, is a symphony composed in 1951, and which served as the basis for the 1957 opera Die Harmonie der Welt.
- Miriam Monaghan (British recorder player and composer) Kepler’s Planets (2019), written for Palisander Recorder Quartet. Extracts were premiered live on BBC Radio 3 In Tune (October 2019) with full concert premiere at London International Festival of Early Music (November 2019).
- Dave Soldier, American composer, wrote Motet: Harmony of the World (2022), closely hewing to Kepler's instructions in the book for a future composer to write a motet, including the use of a specific six-voice choir (recorded by the microtonal choir Ekmeles), the particular just intonation intervals, and the harmonies allowed in Kepler's diagrams. The text sets the Prayer to the Sun by Proclus in ancient Greek, a poet heavily quoted in Kepler's text.

== See also ==
- Pythagoreanism
- Mysterium Cosmographicum
