= Engelberg Tunnel =

Road tunnel in Germany

Coordinates: 48°48′13″N 9°2′17.5″E

The Engelberg Tunnel is a motorway tunnel on the German A81 Autobahn (motorway) just to the west of Stuttgart on the outskirts of Leonberg. During World War II it was used as a Nazi forced labor factory for the manufacture and storage of aircraft parts.

The name is sometimes used to refer to the Old Engelberg Tunnel—which was Germany's second ever motorway tunnel—and sometimes used to refer to its successor, the completely rebuilt Lower Engelberg Tunnel. Both travel under the Engelberg hill to the east of Leonberg on the Stuttgart to Heilbronn A81 motorway.

== The Old Engelberg Tunnel ==
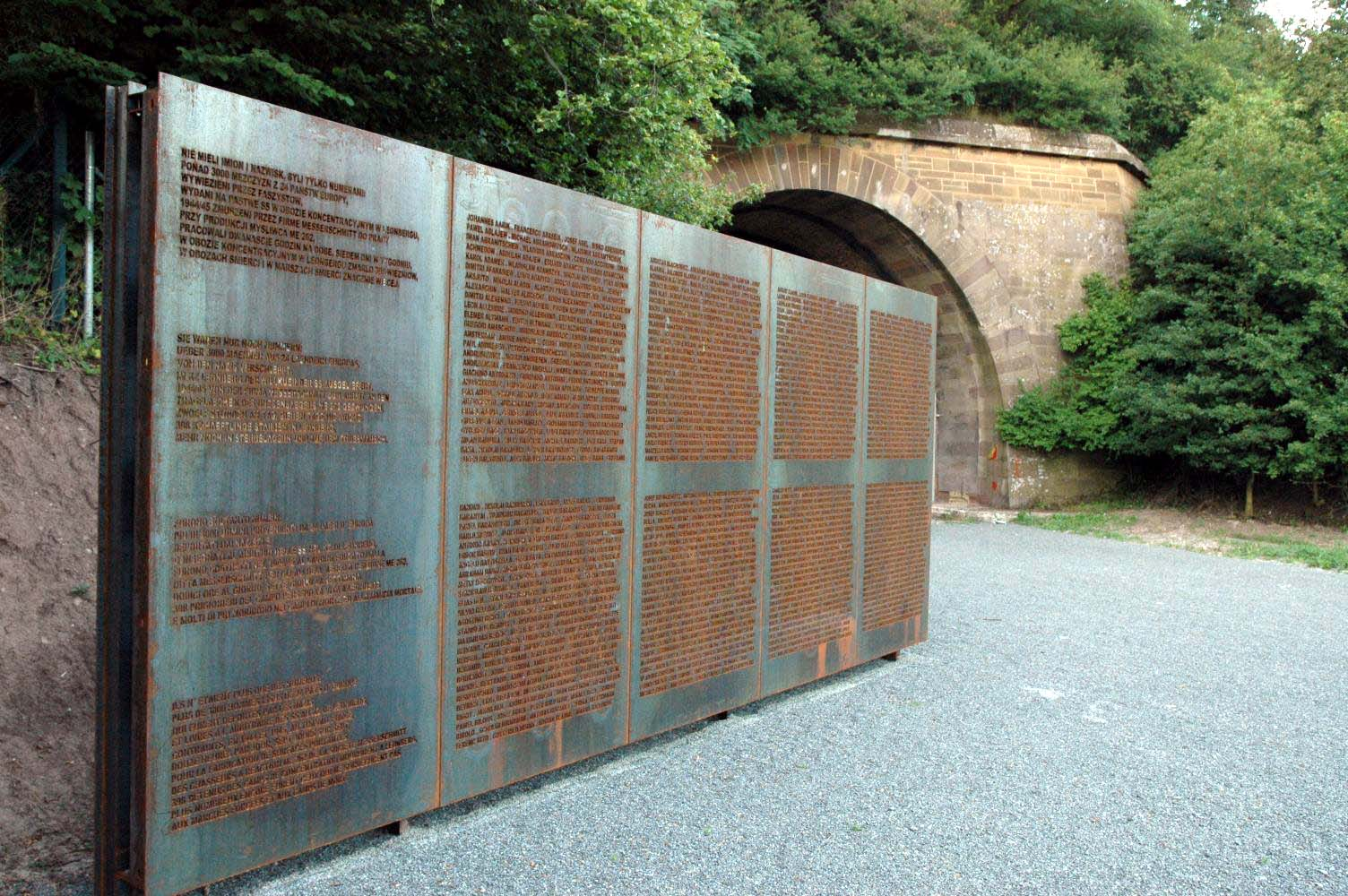
The south exit of the old west tunnel and the concentration camp memorial

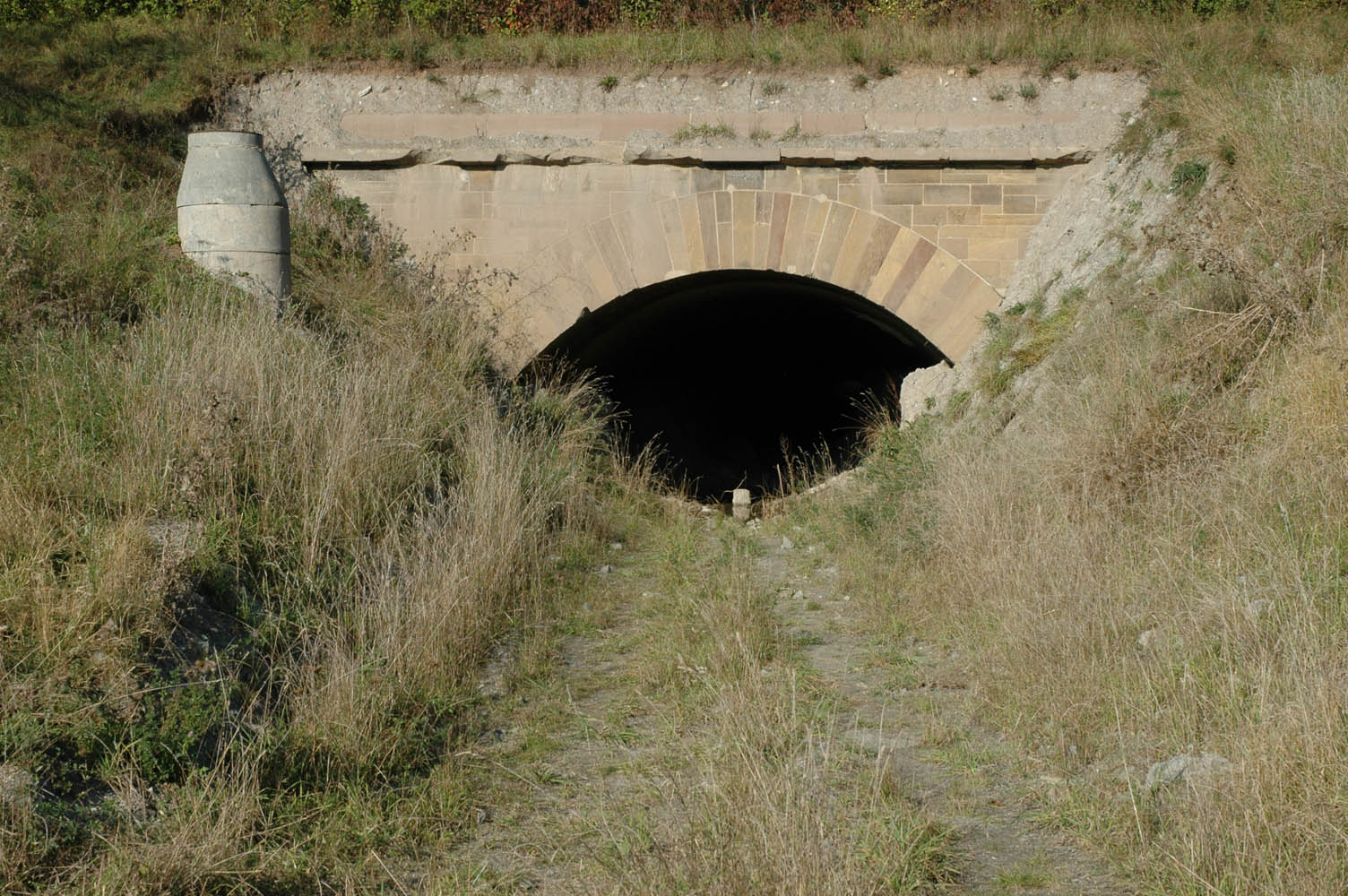
The entrance to the east tunnel when it was still open in October 2007

The original Engelberg twin tunnel was opened to traffic on 5 November 1938 after three years' construction. The 318-metre (1,043 ft) long twin tunnel stood on Route 39 of the network of motorways built during the German Reich and was Germany's first ever motorway tunnel.

=== World War II ===
During World War II both tunnels were closed to traffic in 1944 to be used as a Messerschmitt factory. Nazi slave labourers were brought to work in the factory from the Natzweiler-Struthof concentration camp in Alsace. In shifts lasting between 12 and 18 hours, Zwangsarbeiter (forced workers) assembled wings for Messerschmitt Me 262 fighter-bombers. To provide extra production area, an extra floor was built in the tunnels. Total production area was 11,000 m^{2} (120,000 sq ft).

Around 3,000 people were forced to work in the Engelberg factory. 374 people died there.

Shortly before the end of World War II all the machinery was removed and the tunnels were blown up.

The first tunnel was returned to full working order between 1946 and 1950. The second was completed in 1961.

== Construction of the Lower Engelberg Tunnel ==
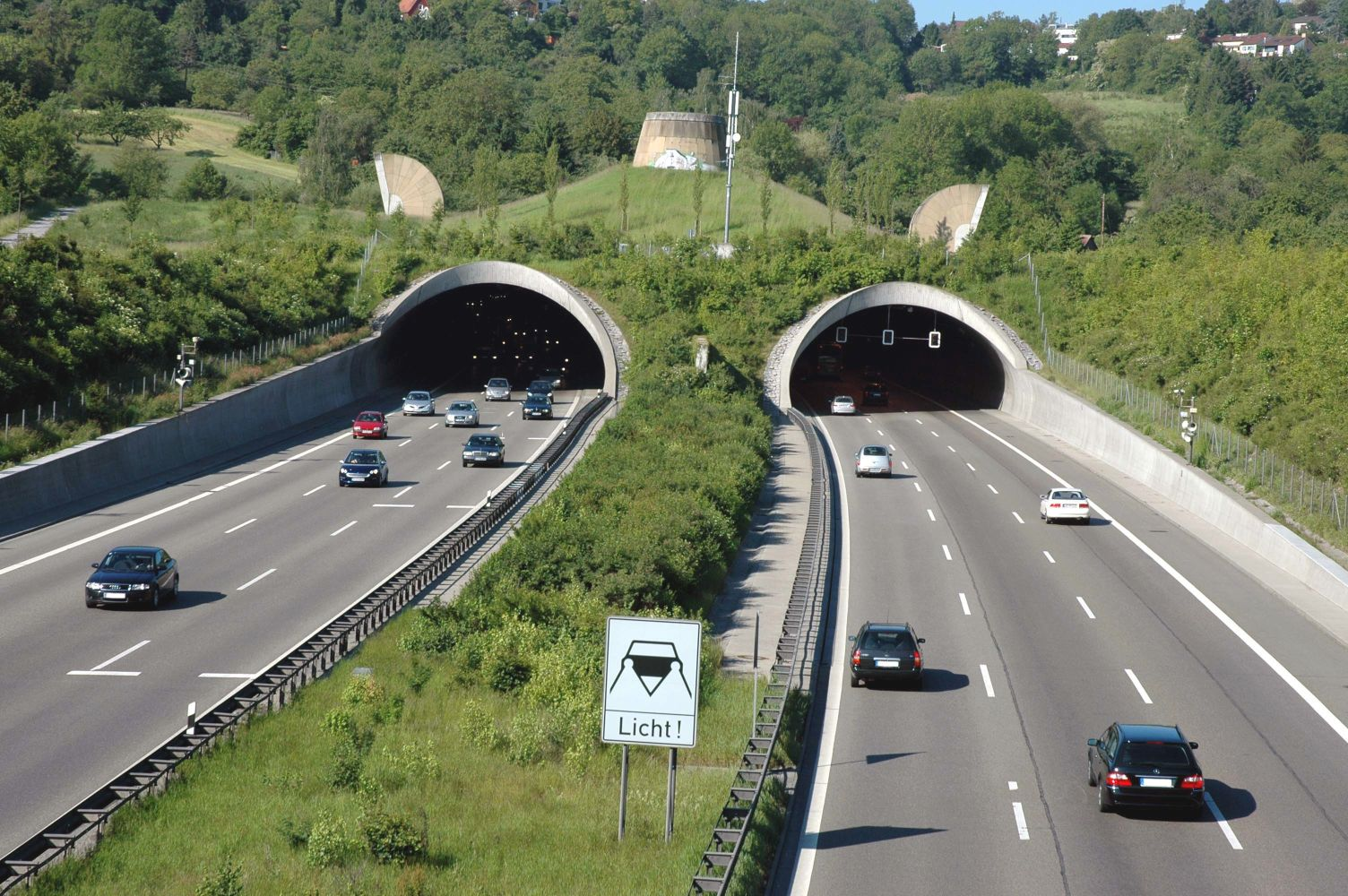
The north exit of the Lower Engelberg Tunnel in June 2006

Each tube of the old tunnel was only wide enough to accommodate two lanes of traffic and lacked a hard shoulder. As traffic volumes rose, the tunnel became a bottleneck, especially for heavy goods vehicles. Traffic jams were not so much caused by the restriction to two lanes as the steep approach to the tunnel. Vehicles approaching from the north had to climb a six percent grade. Lorries slowed significantly before reaching the tunnel causing long back ups of traffic.

In 1999, a new twin tunnel was opened to replace the old tunnels. The old west tunnel remained in place, with the south entrance still open. The old east tunnel was filled in with rubble from construction of the new tunnels. The State handed over control of the old west tunnel to the Leonberg authorities who were considering using it as a bypass. Eventually the south exit to the old west tunnel was turned into a memorial to victims of the concentration camp. The other entrance was filled in. The issue of a bypass for Leonberg has still not been resolved by town councillors.

The area where the old motorway once stood became green belt land and is popular among walkers and people sledging in winter.

In October 2004, the regional authorities expressed concern about the stability of the old tunnels beyond the blocked entrances. An engineering survey was carried out on both tunnels. Experts found that the old tunnels were in danger of collapsing so both were entirely filled in using compressed materials in late 2007 to early 2008 at a cost of around €1 million. The last 20 m (66 ft) of the southern entrance of the west tunnel were left in place as part of the memorial.

The new Lower Engelberg Tunnel enters the Engelberg hill 60 m (200 ft) under the old tunnel. The approach from the north is almost level. Each tunnel is 2,530 m (8,300 ft) long and has tunnel transmitters for uninterrupted car radio and mobile telephone reception.

The cost of the new tunnel was €435 million, financed through private funds. By the time the state of Baden-Württemberg has covered interest costs and allowed for inflation the total tunnel costs will be €720 million. As a result, the financing of the tunnel was heavily criticised for stealing funds from other major projects.
