= Michael Kümmerle =

German footballer

Personal information
- Date of birth: 21 April 1979 (age 47)
- Place of birth: Leonberg, West Germany
- Height: 1.85 m (6 ft 1 in)
- Position: Defender

Youth career
- TSV Weissach
- –1997: TSV Eltingen
- 1997–1999: Stuttgarter Kickers

Senior career*
Years	Team	Apps	(Gls)
1998–2001	Stuttgarter Kickers	59	(5)
2001–2004	Greuther Fürth	16	(2)
2004–2006	1899 Hoffenheim	18	(0)
2006–2007	Kickers Emden	8	(0)
2007–2008	KSV Hessen Kassel	46	(0)
2008–2009	Atromitos Yeroskipou	16	(0)
2009–2010	SpVgg Weiden	12	(0)
2010–2011	VfL Kirchheim	27	(3)
Total		202	(10)

International career
2000	Germany U-21	3	(1)
- * Club domestic league appearances and goals

Michael Kümmerle (born 21 April 1979) is a German former professional footballer who played as a defender.

== Career ==
Kümmerle was born in Leonberg. He spent six seasons on the professional league level in the 2. Bundesliga with Stuttgarter Kickers and Greuther Fürth.
