= Leonberg =

- Town
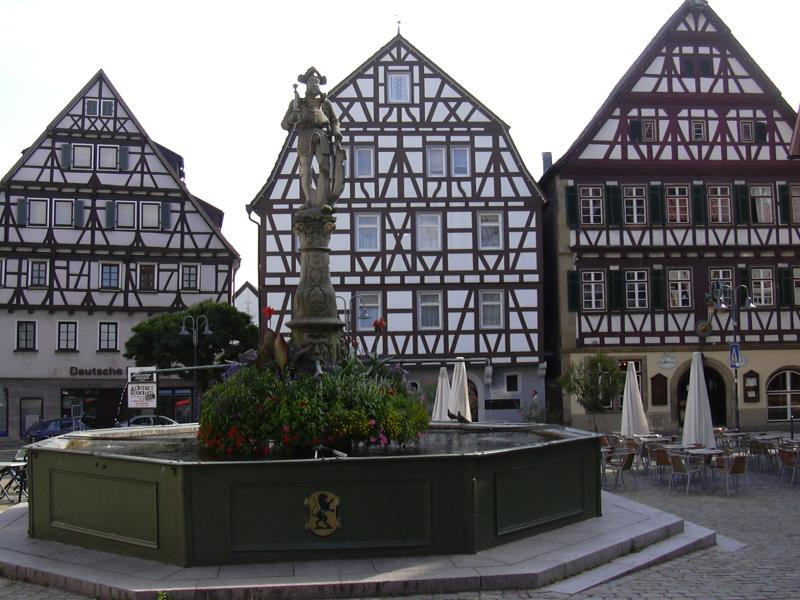
- Traditional houses on market square

- Coat of arms

- Location of Leonberg within Böblingen district
- Interactive map of Leonberg
- Location within Germany Location within Baden-Württemberg
- Coordinates: 48°48′5″N 9°0′47″E
- Country: Germany
- State: Baden-Württemberg
- Admin. region: Stuttgart
- District: Böblingen

Government
  - Mayor (2017–25): Martin Kaufmann (SPD)

Area
  - Total: 48.73 km^{2} (18.81 sq mi)
- Elevation: 386 m (1,266 ft)

Population (2025-12-31)
  - Total: 49,514
  - Density: 1,016/km^{2} (2,632/sq mi)
- Time zone: UTC+01:00 (CET)
  - Summer (DST): UTC+02:00 (CEST)
- Postal codes: 71229
- Dialling codes: 07152
- Vehicle registration: LEO / BB
- Website: www.leonberg.de

Leonberg (German pronunciation: [ˈleːɔnˌbɛʁk]; Swabian: Leaberg) is a town in the German federal state of Baden-Württemberg about 16 km (10 mi) to the west of Stuttgart, the state capital. About 45,000 people live in Leonberg, making it the third-largest borough in the rural district (Landkreis) of Böblingen (after Sindelfingen and Böblingen to the south).

Leonberg is most famous for its picturesque market square, the centuries-old annual horse market, its past role as the seat of one of Württemberg's first parliaments, and the Pomeranzen Garden – Germany's only remaining terraced garden, which dates back to the late Renaissance.

== Geography ==
Leonberg lies on the east bank of the Glems River on the lower slopes of a prominent hill known locally as Engelberg (literally: "Angel Hill"). The Glems flows into Leonberg from the southeast before turning northwest until it reaches the district of Eltingen. Here, it turns northeast into the western part of the old town, carving its way along the valley to the district of Höfingen before flowing northeast towards Ditzingen. The northern districts of Höfingen and Gebersheim belong to Strohgäu for administrative purposes.

=== Neighbouring towns ===
Leonberg is surrounded by these communities (clockwise, starting from the north):
Ditzingen and Gerlingen (districts of Ludwigsburg), Stuttgart, and then the Böblingen rural districts of Magstadt, Renningen, and Rutesheim.

=== Districts ===
Leonberg merged with the neighbouring town of Eltingen in 1938, which now flows seamlessly into the former old town. Administrative reforms in 1975 also resulted in the districts of Gebersheim, Höfingen, and Warmbronn becoming part of Leonberg. Central Leonberg encompasses Silberberg, Ramtel, Gartenstadt, and the residential neighbourhoods of Eichenhof, Glemseck, Hinter Ehrenberg, Mahdental, and Rappenhof. The district of Höfingen also includes the residential neighbourhoods of Tilgshäusleshof and Wannenhof.

Although incorporated into Leonberg in 1975, Gebersheim, Höfingen, and Warmbronn are separate constituencies in local elections.

== History ==
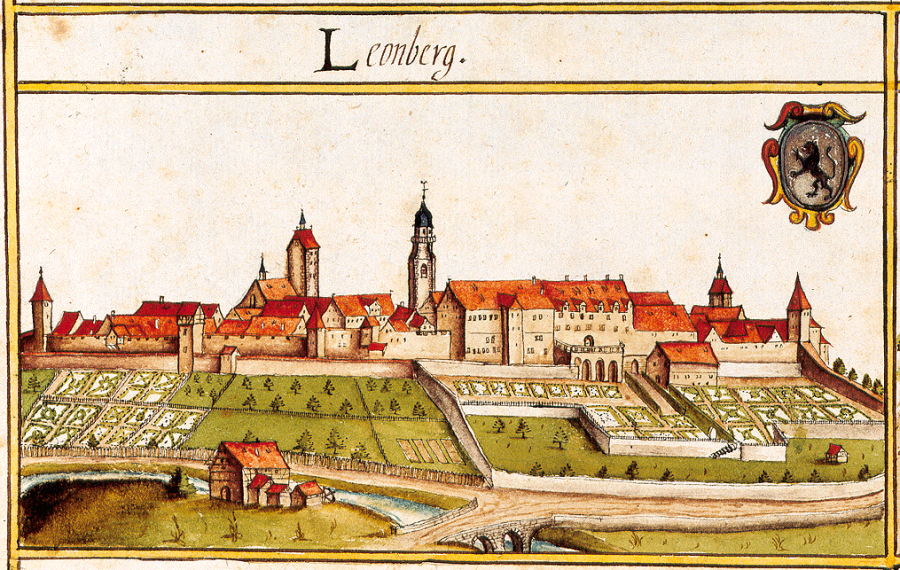
View by Andreas Kieser, 1682

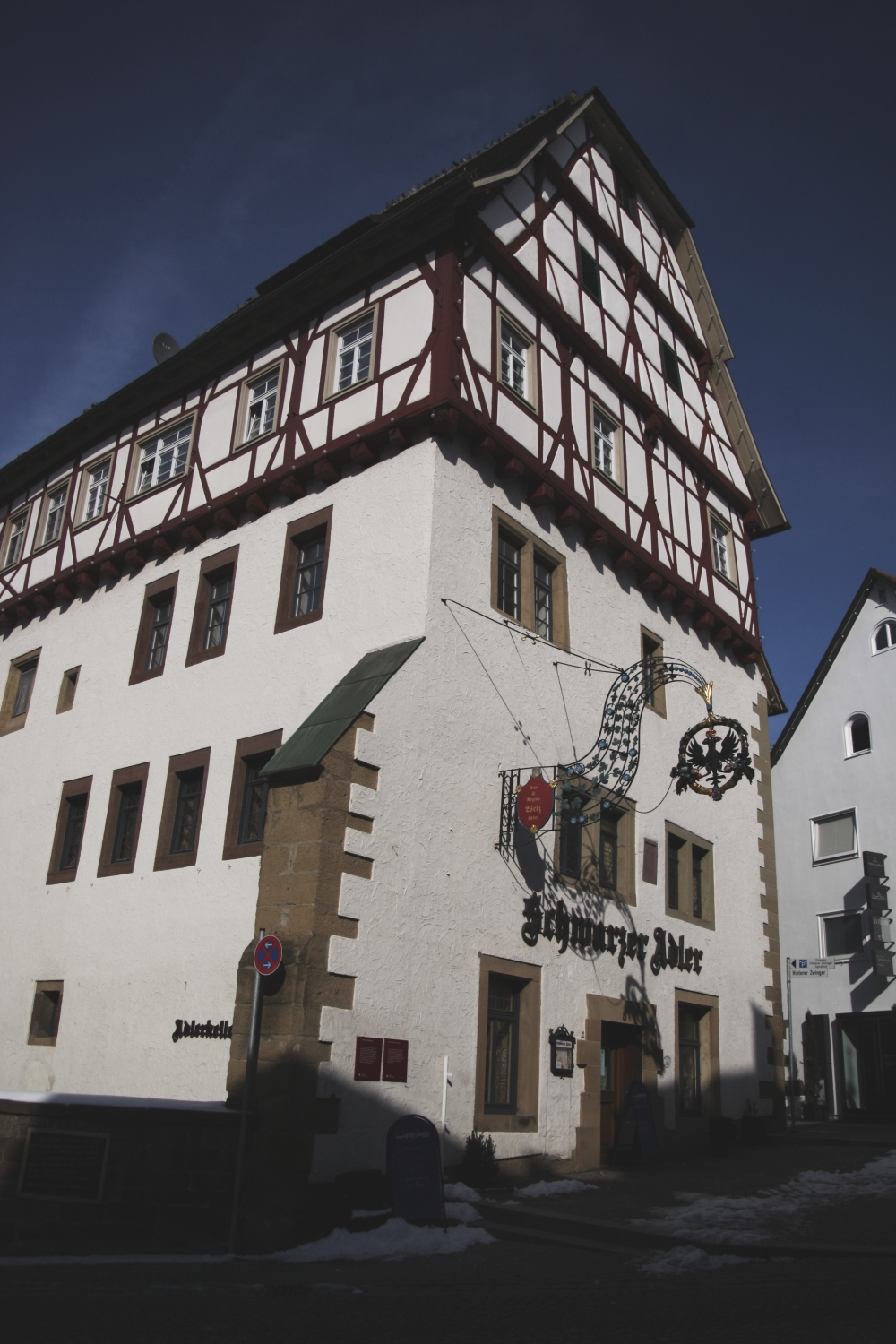
The Schwarzer Adler in Leonberg, the first seat of the parliament of Württemberg

The town of Levinberch was founded by Ulrich I, Count of Württemberg, in 1248, where Leonberg still stands today. The position on the brow of the hill was chosen as a defence from enemies to the west, the towns of Markgröningen, Weil der Stadt, and the counts in Tübingen and Calw. At the time, the town was surrounded by stone fortifications with the count's castle in the southwest. A moat stood to the east, leading to two gates complete with towers and a swing bridge. The gates and almost all of the walls were demolished in and after 1814/1815, leaving only the coat of arms still on display in the Altes Rathaus (old town hall)). The moat was filled in 1786.

The only surviving building from the old town fortifications was the "Stonehouse" near the uppermost tower, probably because it was the only one used for housing and was not destroyed by the great fire of 1498. Today, it has become the Schwarzer Adler guesthouse and is a defining feature of the old town. According to an analysis in 1999, the wooden-timber gabled roof on top of the Schwarzer Adler was built in the 15th century. Three stories high, it is one of southern Germany's largest and oldest original timber-gable roofs.

A great fire swept through the town in 1498, destroying 46 houses and making around 200 people homeless. Most of the homeless left the town.

During the Holy Roman Empire, Leonberg fell under the jurisdiction of Esslingen before finally becoming part of Württemberg in 1383, when it first gained administrative rights. The population of Leonberg was halved during the Thirty Years' War as a result of the bubonic plague.

On 16 November 1457, the first Württemberg parliament (Württemberg-Urach) convened in Leonberg to administer the custodianship of the underaged Eberhardt V. Although no documentary evidence confirms the fact, many locals claim this parliament met in the "Stonehouse".

During the era of witch hunts, the Leonberg governor Lutherus Einhorn sent 15 women to trial under suspicion of witchcraft. Eight women were condemned to death with the full assent of the Leonberg judiciary and the local community.

One of the most famous Württemberg witch trials in Leonberg took place in 1615 and involved Katharina Kepler, mother of the royal astronomer Johannes Kepler. Kepler's mother was nearly tortured to death in the cellars of the "Stonehouse" before being transferred to Güglingen, where she was subsequently released in October 1620.

In 1846, the Leonberger dog breed was first successfully registered and named after the town.

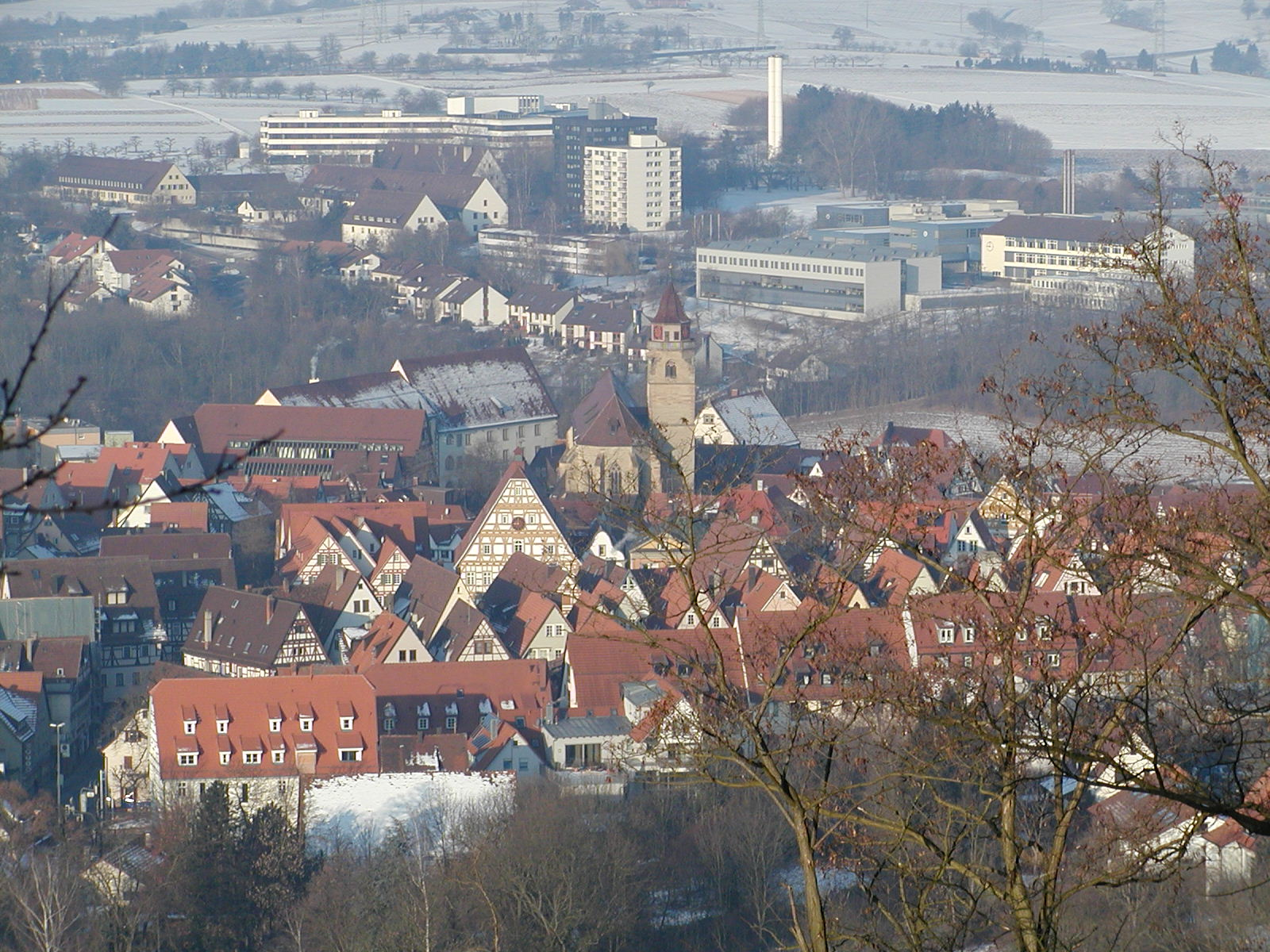
The old town viewed from Engelberg

After the rise of the Nazis in 1933, several bloody street battles were fought between stormtrooper (Sturmabteilung) followers, mostly backed by residents from Leonberg, who attacked supporters of the German communist party, mainly residents in Eltingen. In 1938, Eltingen – a staunchly proletarian community of small landowners - was finally merged with the more bourgeois Leonberg.

Later the same year, the Engelberg Tunnel - Germany's first motorway tunnel - was completed. During the Second World War, the tunnel was used regularly for producing and storing aeroplane parts made by prisoners held in Leonberg concentration camp, an outlying camp belonging to Natzweiler-Struthof concentration camp in Alsace. The old tunnel was replaced by a new tunnel in the 1990s. Above the tunnel now stands a memorial to the people who died in the Leonberg concentration camp.

By 1961, the population of Leonberg passed 20,000. Boundary reforms in 1973 resulted in the rural districts of Leonberg being merged with the rural districts of Böblingen in the south and Enzkreis/Ludwigsburg in the north. Leonberg has existed in its current form since 1975.

In 2004, Leonberg became one of the first communities in Germany to switch its office systems to Linux and start using freeware.

=== Population development ===
The population figures are estimates, census results (¹) or official updates of the respective statistical offices (only primary residences).

Year	Population figures
1470	900
1630	1,250
1640	630
1703	1,076
1803	1,611
1843	2,195
1861	2,167
1. December 1871	2,061
1. December 1880 ¹	2,226
1. December 1890 ¹	2,472
1. December 1900 ¹	2,524
1. December 1910 ¹	2,923
16. June 1925 ¹	3,200

Year	Population figures
16. June 1933 ¹	3,698
17. May 1939 ¹	8,335
1946	10,329
13. September 1950 ¹	12,430
6. June 1961 ¹	20,330
27. May 1970 ¹	24,995
31. December 1975	35,731
31. December 1980	38,927
27. May 1987 ¹	40,303
31. December 1990	42,654
31. December 1995	43,748
31. December 2000	44,354
31. December 2005	45,624

¹ Census results

== Main sights ==
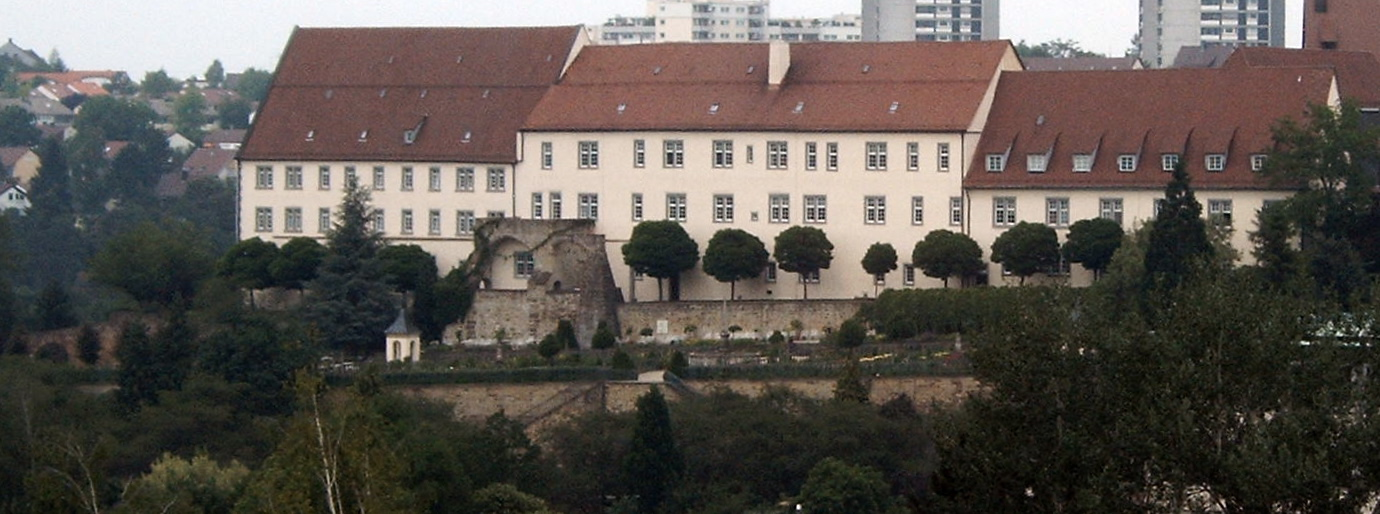
The palace

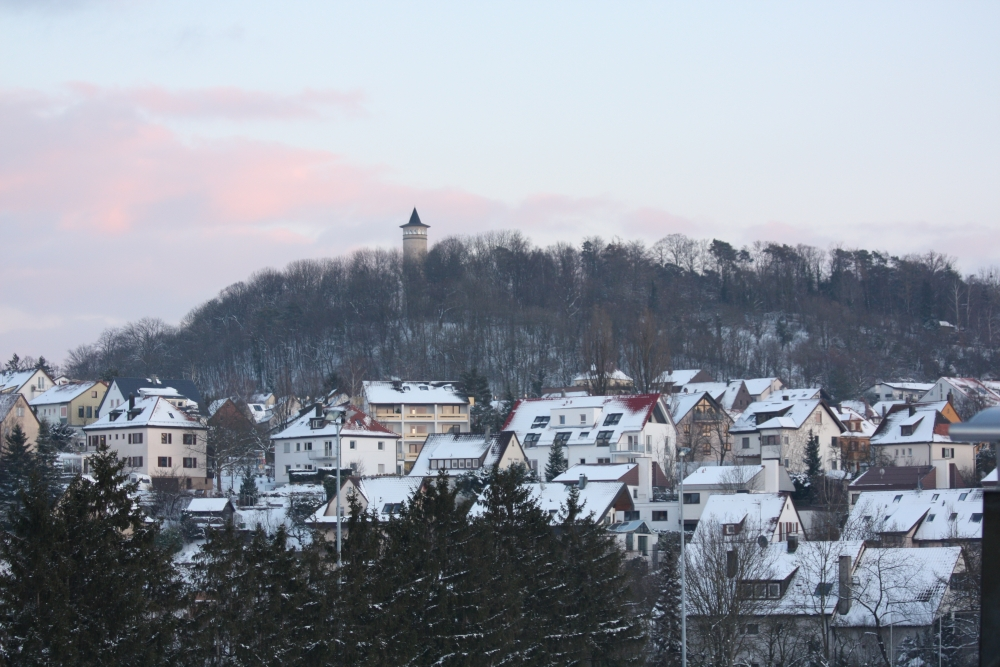
The "Engelberg" hill and water tower – built in 1929, at 469 m above sea level

The old town dates back to the Middle Ages and includes a historical market square lined by restored half-timbered houses. Standing among them is the old Town Hall (Rathaus), which, with the water tower on Engelberg Hill, is considered a defining feature of Leonberg. The birth house of Schelling and the huge Zum Schwarzen Adler guesthouse - the first documented seat of parliament of the County of Württemberg - are also key features of the old town. Further attractions include the Evangelical Church (Stadtkirche) with its Roman and Gothic architecture and the former Latin school (which was attended by the astronomer and mathematician Johannes Kepler). The old Latin school now houses the town museum and Schelling Memorial Chapel. The town park contains a variety of modern sculptures. On the eastern outskirts of Leonberg is the Engelberg Tunnel.

Leonberg's Pomeranzen Garden (Pomeranzengarten) is Germany's only remaining terraced garden. Named after the German word for "bitter orange", the garden originally dates back to the height of the Renaissance. It was planted in 1609 next to the palace (Schloss) as a retreat for widows of the Württemberg duchy. In 1742, it was converted into a fruit and vegetable garden until it was restored in 1980 using Heinrich Schickhardt's original plans.

The Michaelskirche in Eltingen was built in 1487 with a single nave overlooked by rib vaulting and a retracted chancel. The tower is adorned by late Gothic acoustic windows and a polygonal spire.

Other sights include:

- The Protestant church in Gebersheim was built in 1588. The nave was removed in 1968 and extended. The tower is still decorated with pre-Reformation frescos.
- The Farmhouse Museum (Bauernhausmuseum) was opened in 1995.
- The parish church in Höfingen has a Gothic nave. The west tower with its polygonal spire dates back to 18th century.
- In Warmbronn, a museum is dedicated to the author Christian Wagner. The evangelical church was built in classical style in 1784.
- The lake house (Seehaus) in Glemseck was built by the royal architect Heinrich Schickhardt in 1609 for Sibylla of Anhalt.

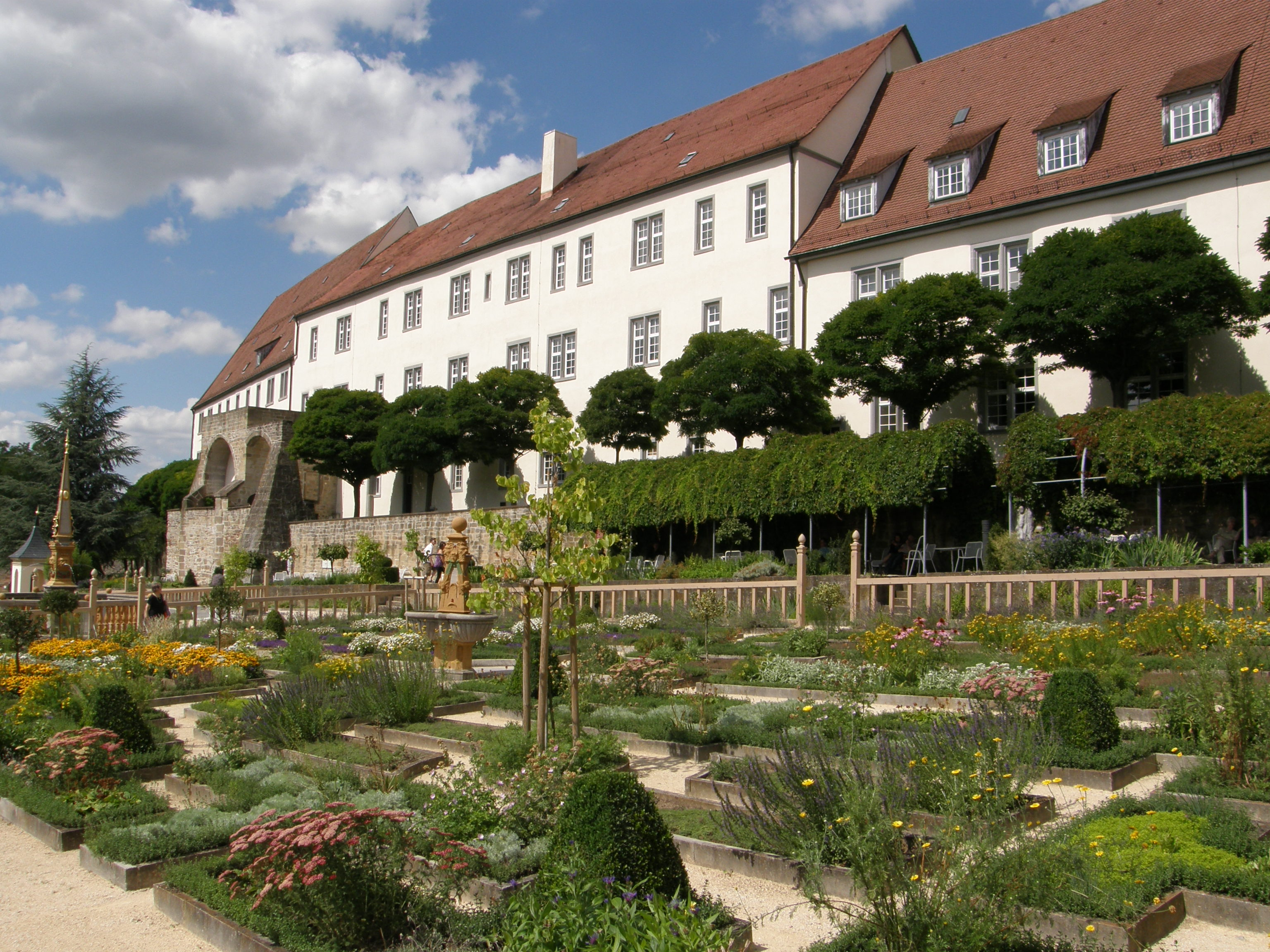
The Pomeranzen Garden, which was restored in 1980

== Religion ==
Leonberg once fell into the bishopric of Speyer and was part of an area governed by archdeacon St. Trinitatis. As an early member of Württemberg, in 1535, Duke Ulrich introduced the Reformation. For many centuries, Leonberg was predominantly Protestant. In 1552, the deanery was moved to Leonberg, with the Stadtkirche becoming the Dekanatskirche. After the Second World War, the religious community in Leonberg grew quickly as people moved into the area. The Protestant community in the district of Eltingen also dates back to the Reformation, as it does in Gebersheim, Höfingen, and Warmbronn.

After the reformation, Catholicism first reappeared in Leonberg in the late 19th century with the first parish set up in 1946 shortly followed by St. Johannes Baptista church in 1950. Today, the Catholic community belongs to the deanery of Böblingen within the bishopric of Rottenburg-Stuttgart.

Apart from the two main German religions, "free churches" such as the United Methodist Church (Pauluskirche), the Seventh-day Adventist Church, and the Immanuel Community of Leonberg also are present, as is a New Apostolic Church.

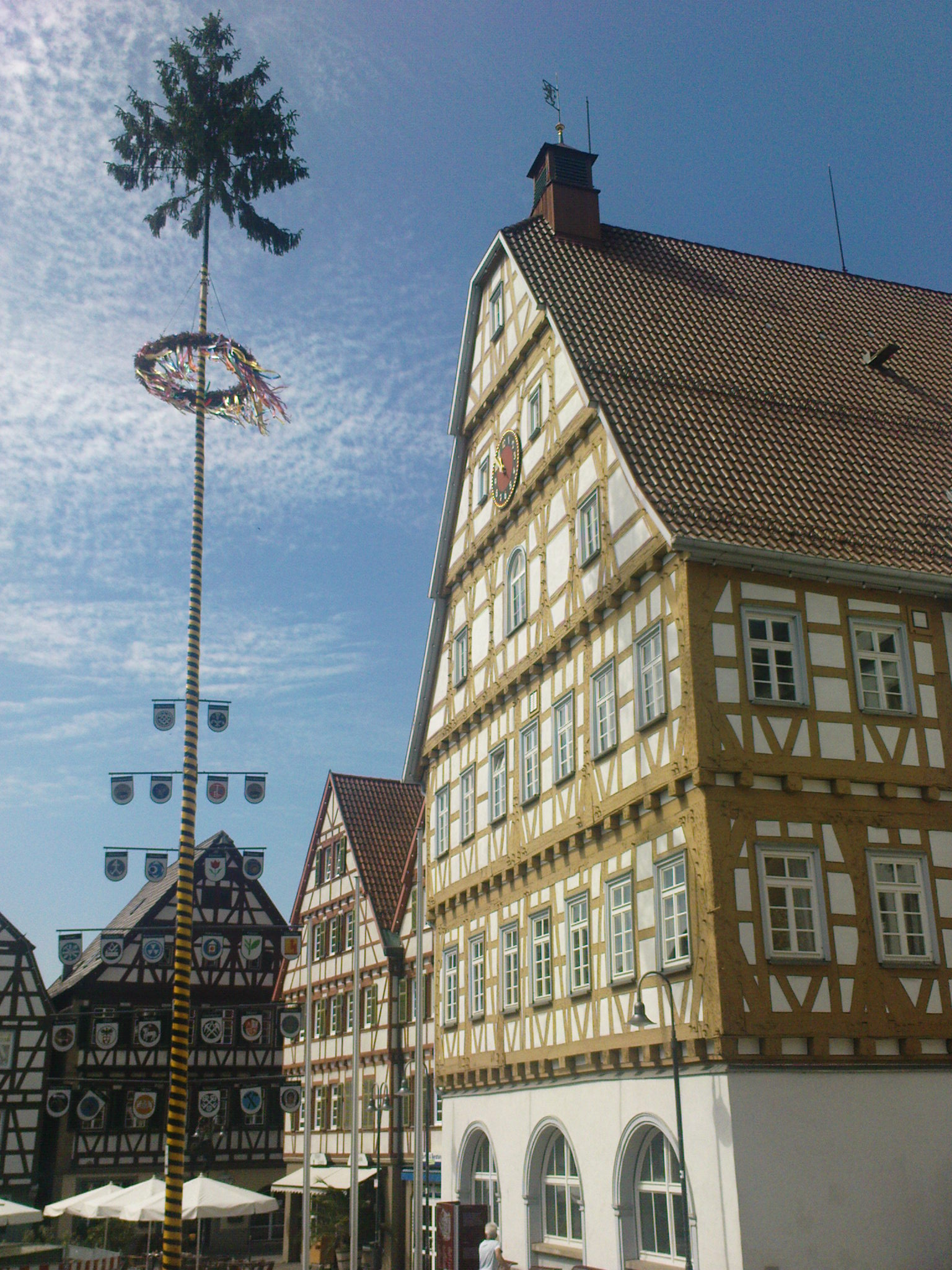
Leonberg Town Hall: In front of the building, the traditional Maypole with plaques represents local guilds.

== Politics ==
=== Borough council ===
Since the latest round of local elections in June 2004, the district council has had 34 seats distributed as: The distribution of the seats among the various parties and groups since the election of June 2009 looks like this, changes over 2004 in brackets:

- CDU 20,6% (−7,7) – 7 seats (−3)
- FWV 18,4% (−1,8) – 7 seats (±0)
- SPD 17,3% (−4,0) – 6 seats (−1)
- Greens 16,2% (+1,3) – 6 seats (+1)
- FDP 11,7% (+2,3) – 4 seats (+1)
- Neue Liste Leonberg 10,5% (+10,5) − 3 seats (+3)
- SALZ (abbreviation in German for "Town: work, life, future") 5,0% (−0,5) – 1 seats (−1)

=== Town mayors ===
A head of local administration - an executive official called the Schultheiss - was first appointed in Leonberg in 1304. In 1425, this was replaced by a Vogt, a type of reeve. By 1535, responsibility was shared by a senior and junior governor, both of whom were selected by a local judge. After the 15th century, two burgomasters were replaced by a type of senior district magistrate (Oberamtmann) in 1759. A town council has existed in Leonberg since 1312; in 1523, it had eight members.

In 1930, the interim designation of town mayor was replaced by the now common burgomaster whose status was raised to Oberbürgermeister (senior mayor) in 1963. The mayor is elected for eight years through a direct vote, and chairs the borough council.

=== Communities now merged into Leonberg ===
- Eltingen (1938)
- Gebersheim, Höfingen, Warmbronn, and Silberberg (formerly part of Renningen, subsequently amalgamated with the Silberberg area of Leonberg; 1975)

== Economy ==
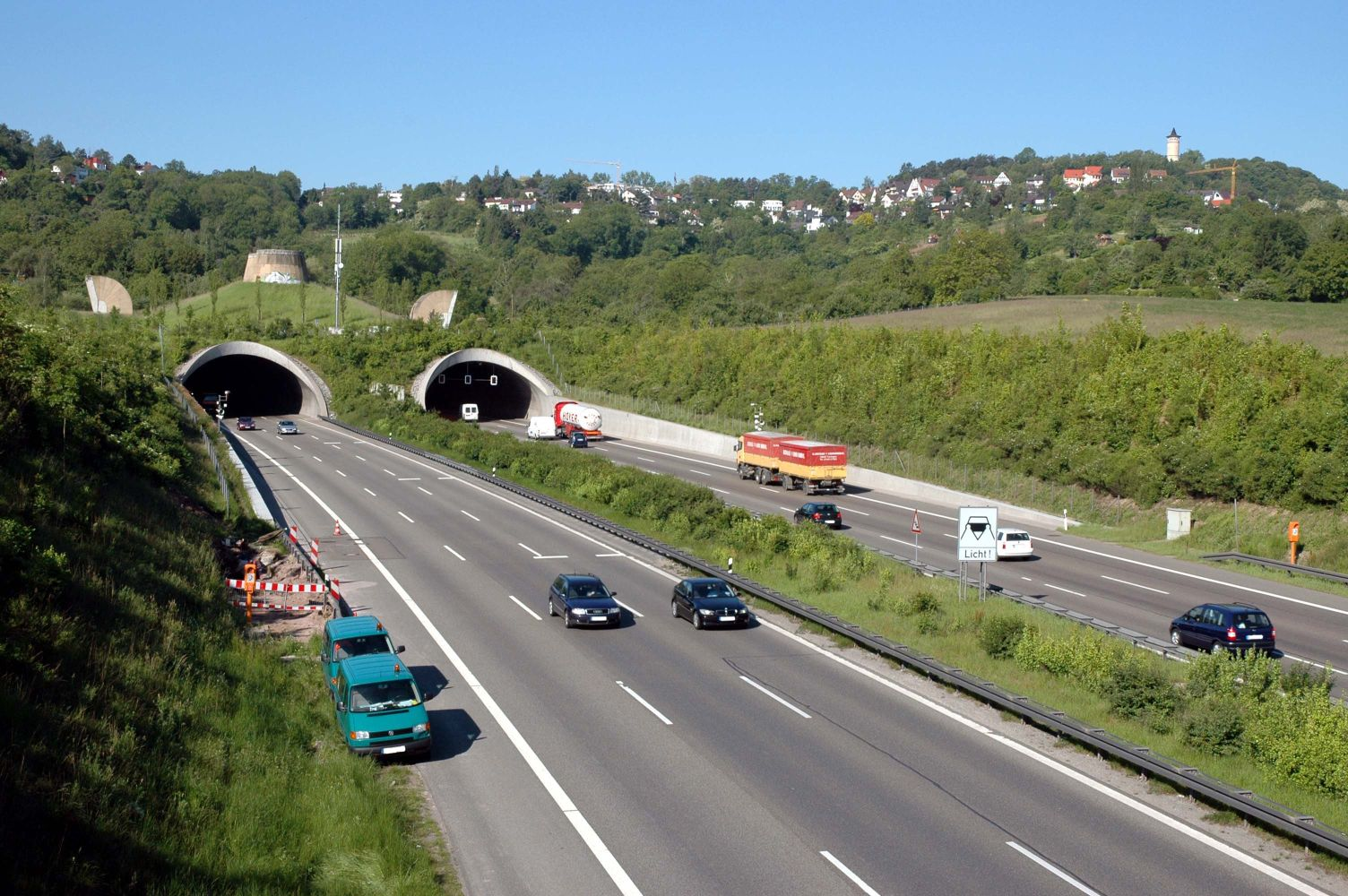
The A81 Autobahn (motorway) entering the Engelberg tunnel

Local companies include

- GEZE, a regional supplier of door closing and security solutions founded in 1863 and employing 1900 people, has its headquarters in Leonberg.
- Since the 1990s, Robert Bosch GmbH has employed just under 1000 people at its administration and development centre on a site formerly used by Motometer.
- The oldest savings bank in Leonberg, the Leonberger Bausparkasse, was founded in 1924 as the Christian Emergency Confederation for Mutual Support. The bank was taken over in 2001 by the Wüstenrot savings bank.
- Software company caatoosee, formerly based in Stuttgart, is headquartered in premises once occupied by Philipp Holzmann in Leonberg.
- The traditional piano maker, Pfeiffer, relocated from Stuttgart to Leonberg in 1994. The organ maker, Mühleisen, is also based in Leonberg.
- LEWA, an international supplier of processing pumps and metering systems has its headquarters in Leonberg. In 2009 the company employed about 400 people in the town.

Leonberg falls within the wine-growing area of Württemberg called Remstal-Stuttgart. Most of the local vineyards lie to the south of the town in the Feinau area and on the Ehrenberg slopes along the Glems river.

== Transport ==
Leonberg is connected to the German motorway system (Autobahn) by the nearby A8 going from west to east (Karlsruhe to Stuttgart, Ulm, München) and eventually Salzburg in Austria and beyond), as well as the A81 going north to south (Würzburg to Stuttgart and Singen). The two motorways meet at the Leonberg intersection, which lies to the south of the town. The nearest motorway junctions are called Leonberg-Ost (Leonberg East) and Leonberg-West (Leonberg West), the latter having been newly constructed and opened in September 2009.

Leonberg is served by the local transport network of Stuttgart and nearby towns, including (since 1978) line S6 of the Stuttgart S-Bahn running from Weil der Stadt via Leonberg to Stuttgart city centre. As well as Leonberg station, there are S-Bahn stops in the districts of Höfingen and Silberberg (stop name: Rutesheim). Several bus lines belonging to local and Stuttgart networks (VVS) also travel through or terminate in Leonberg.

Leonberg has been a Low Emission Zone (LEZ) since March 2008, following the suit of other German cities. This affects all vehicles entering the borough of Leonberg "Environmental zone" (Umweltzone), including vehicles from abroad.

== Education ==
All types of schools common to Germany are found in Leonberg:

- "Gymnasium" (grammar school): Albert-Schweitzer-Gymnasium, Johannes-Kepler-Gymnasium
- "Realschule" (restricted-entry, vocationally orientated secondary school): Ostertag-Realschule, Pestalozzischule (sponsored school)
- Primary/Hauptschule (unlimited entry senior school): August Lämmle, Schellingschule, Höfingen
- Primary school: Mörikeschule, Sophie-Scholl-Schule, Spitalschule plus schools in Gebersheim and Warmbronn.

The district of Böblingen funds a vocational college plus the Karl-Georg-Haldenwang-Schule for the disabled.

Leonberg is also home to an Evangelical College for Care Workers.

== Culture ==
=== Leonberg horse market ===
Leonberg's famous horse market takes place every year in February. The traditional fair is staged in the old town centring on the old market square. The first horse market was arranged with the permission of Duke Frederick Charles on 15 February 1684. A ceremonial procession marches through the old town on the second Tuesday of the month to mark the occasion. The horse market attracts huge crowds and is so important to local tradition that civil servants are granted half a day's leave to attend. Schools in Leonberg are closed for the whole day. In modern times, the scope of the fair has been expanded to include sports, seminars on horseriding and breeding, an amusement fair and a flea market.

=== Theatre ===
The theatre in the Spitalhof stages musicals, plays, amateur theatre, concerts and children's events with regular visits from touring theatres also performing in the town auditorium (Stadthalle). The Traumpalast cinema hall in Leonberg has the world's largest IMAX screen measuring 38×22m.

=== Music ===
Music societies have a strong tradition in Leonberg with the oldest society, 'Lyra Eltingen', dating back to 1897. The Leonberg symphony orchestra was founded in 1970 as a youth orchestra. Today it comprises 70 musicians and is conducted by Alexander Adiarte.

There is a children's music school in Leonberg which provides tuition in partnership with the Lyra Eltingen music association and Höfingen music association. The Villa Musica also offers tuition through the Stadtkapelle and Liederkranz music associations.

=== Other regular events ===
- The market square festival ("Marktplatzfest")
- Eltingen street festival ("Strassenfest")
- New Year's Eve celebrations on the market square in Leonberg and Eltingen
- Children's festival in the town park

== Notable people ==
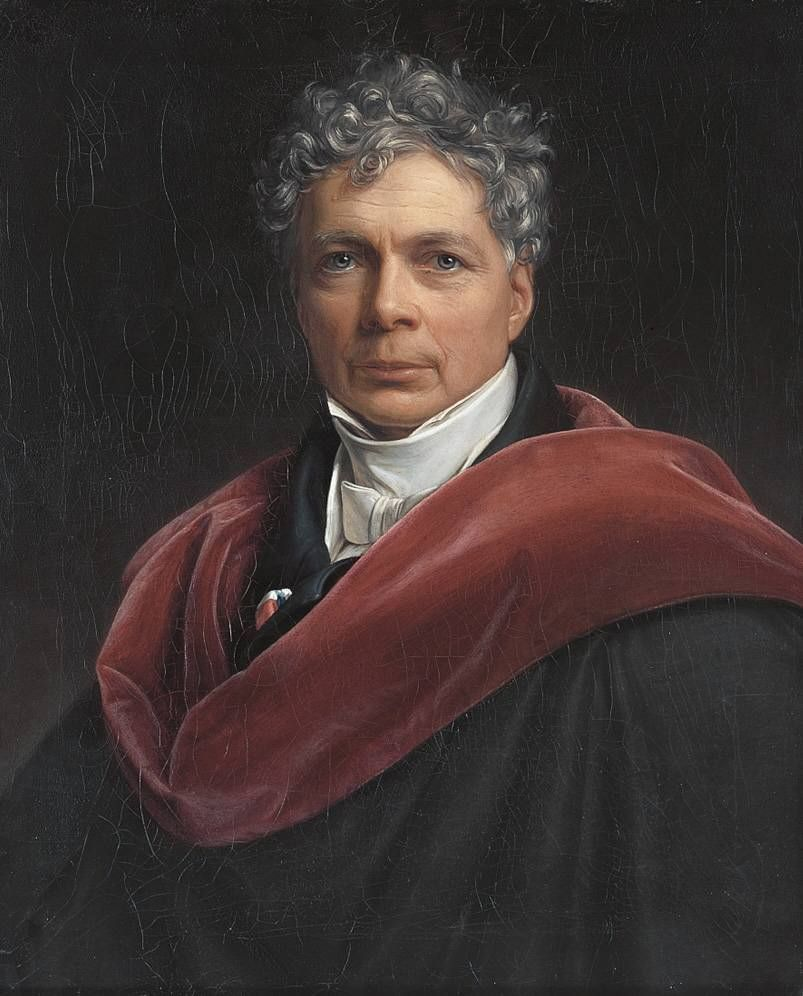
Friedrich Wilhelm Joseph Schelling, 1835

- Conrad of Leonberg (1460–1511), a Cistercian monk and Humanist scholar.
- Katharina Kepler (née: Guldenmann; 1547–1622), mother of Johannes Kepler. She was accused of witchcraft in 1615, but was defended by her son and released.
- Heinrich Paulus (1761–1851), theologian and critic of the Bible.
- Friedrich Wilhelm Joseph Schelling (1775–1854), main proponent of German idealism.
- Theodor von Heuglin (1824 in Hirschlanden – 1876), explorer and ornithologist.
- Gottlieb Hering (1887–1945), Nazi SS commandant of the Belzec extermination camp
- Erwin Schoettle (1899–1976), politician (SPD), Bundestag vice president 1961–1969, resistance fighter against Nazism
- Martin Winterkorn (born 1947), former chairman of the Board of Volkswagen AG
- Bernd Riexinger (born 1955), politician (Die Linke), chairman of the Left Party
- Eva Briegel (born 1978), singer and member of the rock band Juli.
- Sebastian Hertner (1991–2025), footballer

== Sport ==
- Erwin Staudt (born 1948), football manager, President of VfB Stuttgart (2003–2011), former manager at IBM Germany
- Dennis Hillebrand (born 1979), footballer, who played 292 games
- Michael Kümmerle (born 1979), footballer who played 202 games
- Marcus Mann (born 1984), footballer who played 355 games, current sporting director of Hannover 96.
- Sebastian Hertner (born 1991), footballer who has played over 320 games

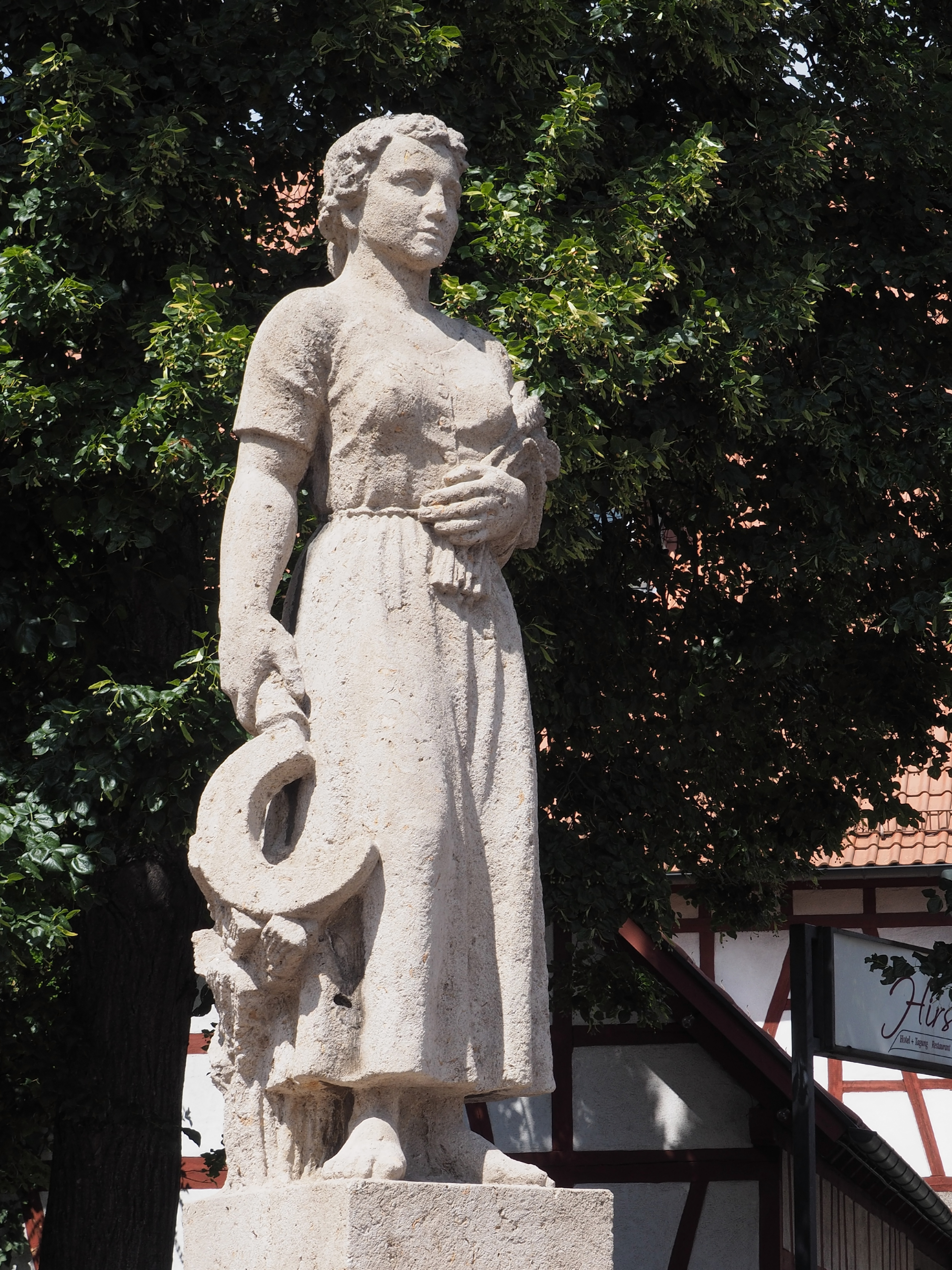
Woman with sickle, dedicated to Katharina Kepler

=== Associated with the town ===
- After the death of her husband, Duke Friedrich I of Württemberg (1557–1608), his widow Duchess Sybilla (1564–1614), moved to Leonberg in 1609. The architect Heinrich Schickhardt built the Pomeranzengarten at her request as well as the Lake House ("Seehaus").
- Katharina Kepler (1546–1622), mother of the astronomer Johannes Kepler (1571–1630), was pardoned after 14 months' captivity following a witch trial thus escaping being burnt at the stake.
- Elisabeth Dorothea Schiller (1732–1802), the mother of Friedrich Schiller spent the last years of her life in Leonberg Palace between 1796 and 1801.

== Twin towns – sister cities ==
Leonberg is twinned with:

- Neukölln (Berlin), Germany (1970)
- Belfort, France (1977)
- Rovinj, Croatia (1990)
- Bad Lobenstein, Germany (1991)

== Sources ==
- Württembergisches Städtebuch; Vol. IV, Sub-Volume on Baden-Württemberg No. 2 in the "Deutsches Städtebuch" published by Erich Keyser, 1961
- S. Lorenz, G. Scholz (pub.): Böblingen. Vom Mammutzahn zum Mikrochip. 2003, ISBN 3-935129-09-2
- Bärbel Häcker: Leise, leise, da liegt wieder einer ... Im Leonberg der Weimarer Republik. 2005, ISBN 3-00-017095-2
