= Motometer =

Brand of measurement device

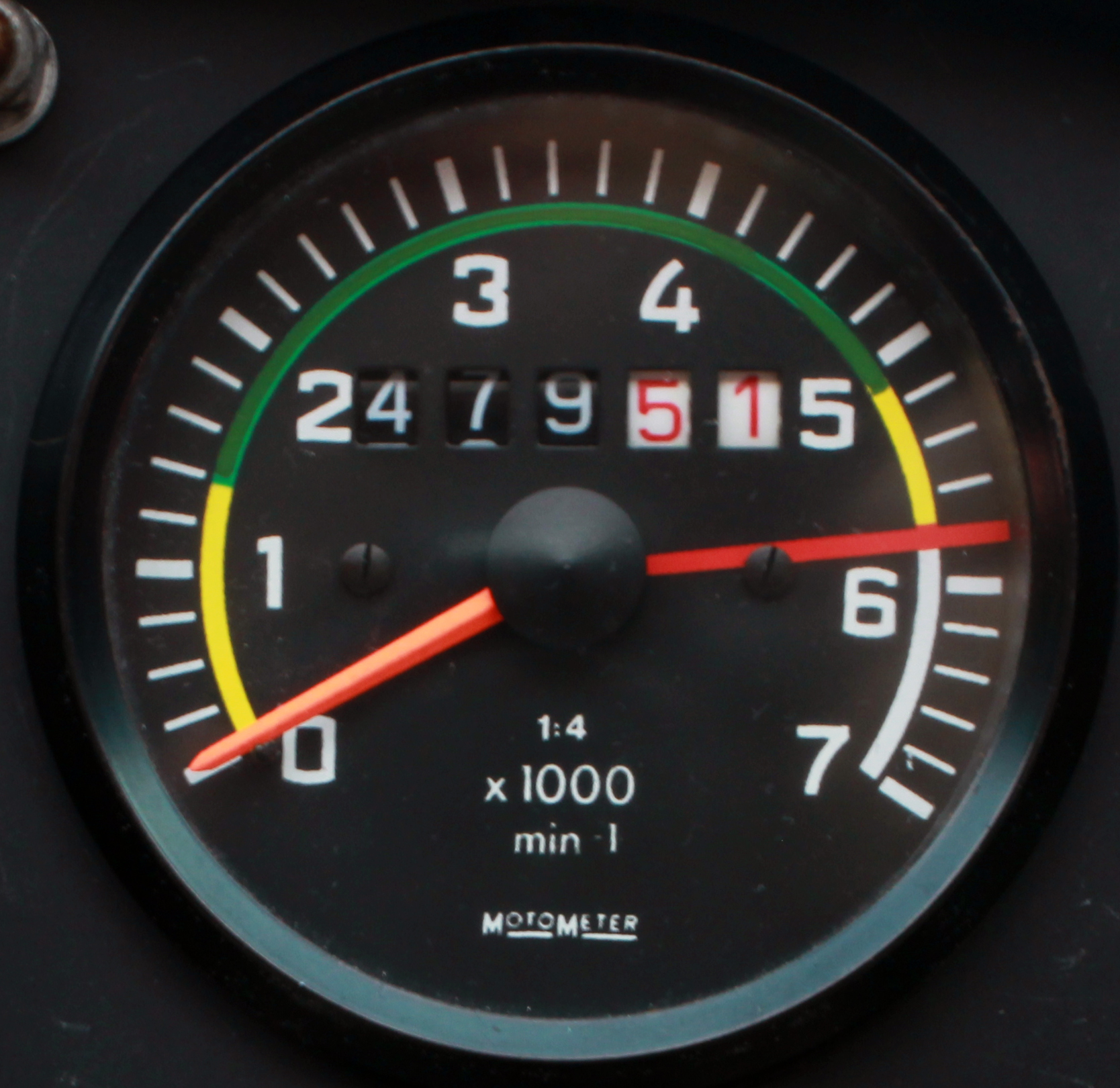
Tachometer with flight length calculator from Motometer.

Motometer (historical names: Moto Meter, MotoMeter, Moto-Meter, MM, Motoco) is a brand, known for measuring and displaying instruments for workshops and vehicle equipment. The originally independent company was founded at the beginning of the 20th century in the area of Stuttgart (South Germany). Until its insolvency in 1995, the Moto Meter AG was listed on the Frankfurt Stock Exchange.

== History ==
In 1912, a Swabian inventor started the development of practical tools as well as measuring and displaying instruments for workshops and vehicle equipment companies. Some of the instruments developed at the beginnings of Motometer's traditional history can still be found in workshops today, such as the Recording Compression Tester or the Tyre Pressure Tester. In 1925, Moto-Meter-GmbH (Frankfurt a.M.) was mentioned in business documents for the first time. One year later, the company was listed in the Commercial Registry Stuttgart as “Moto Meter Hermann Schlaich GmbH”.

In 1966, Moto Meter Hermann Schlaich GmbH owned four production plants, in Stuttgart, Leonberg, Neckarhausen and Nagold, in which 1100 people were employed. Today, the documents of Moto Meter Hermann Schlaich GmbH can be found in the archive for corporate publications in the German Museum (Deutsches Museum) in Munich. In 1969, the company changed its name to Moto Meter GmbH, with the head office in Leonberg. In 1977, Moto Meter GmbH was incorporated.

In 1991, Moto Meter AG was taken over by Robert Bosch GmbH. After the takeover,Bosch/Motometer had a market share of approximately 10% in the strongly concentrated market of display instruments and was the third-largest of that type, the market leaders being Magneti Marelli and VDO. Bosch/Motometer supplied 95% of the instrument panels installed by German vehicle manufacturers.

In 1992, the company changed the firm’s name into MM Messtechnik GmbH and MM Messtechnik GmbH closed a contract with the Robert Bosch GmbH. In 1996, IVEKA Automotive Technologies Schauz GmbH was founded in Mühlacker, assumed the brand Motometer, and continued with its distribution and commercialisation.

During the liquidation of Moto Meter AG through Robert Bosch GmbH the Federal Constitutional Court of Germany it was decided, due to an appeal by the German Association for the Protection of Small Shareholders, that each liquidation through a majority shareholder had to be checked judicially. The appeal was dismissed due to insignificance, because the Association held only two shares in Moto Meter AG.

== Today’s products and company structure ==
The Motometer Group offers today a wide range of services and products, which varies from OEM-products (products for original equipment manufacturers) and aftermarket products to customised solutions for small and medium-sized series. The Motometer Group consists of three subdivisions. The trade-, distribution- and service-department, the development-department and the production-department, which are represented through three independent corporations.
