= Die Harmonie der Welt =

Opera by Paul Hindemith

- Opera by Paul Hindemith
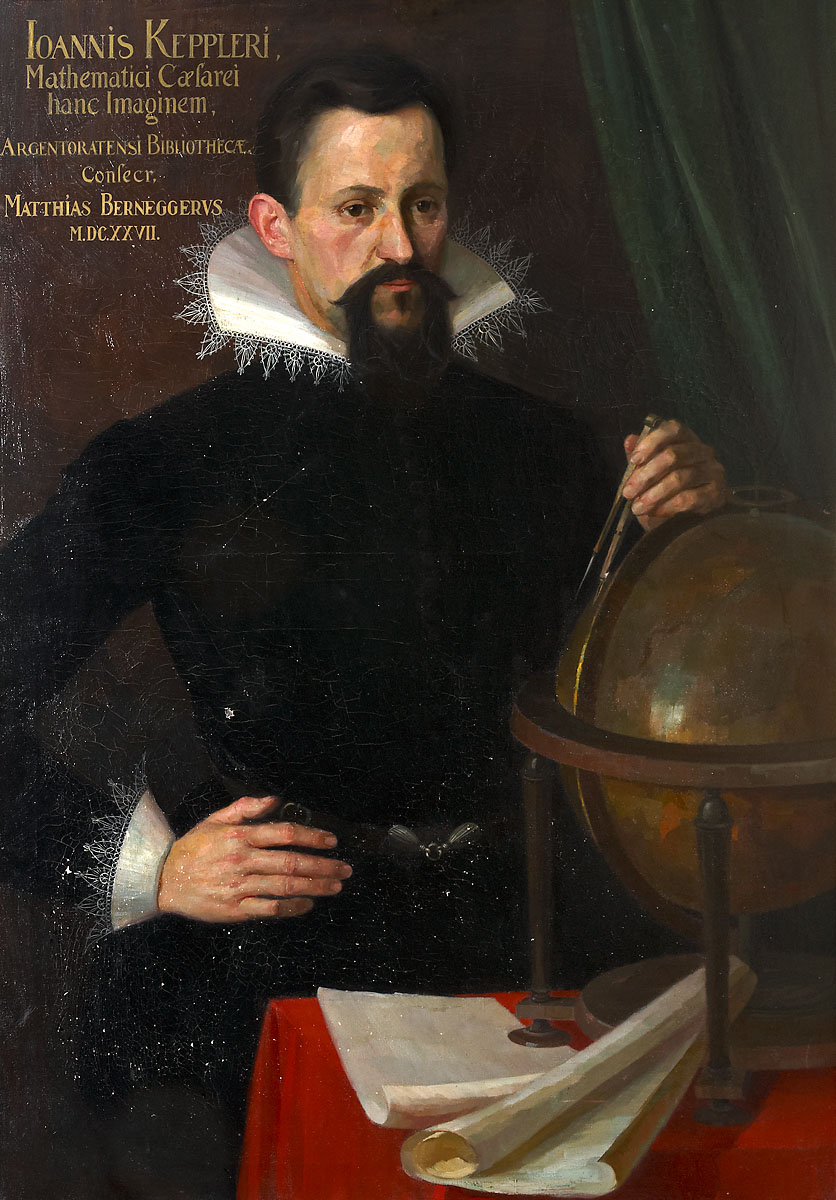
- Johannes Kepler, whose work inspired the opera and its title
- Translation: The Harmony of the World
- Librettist: Hindemith
- Language: German
- Based on: Kepler's Harmonices Mundi
- Premiere: 11 August 1957; Prinzregententheater, Munich
- Website: Die Harmonie der Welt · The Harmony of the World · L’Harmonie du monde

Die Harmonie der Welt (The Harmony of the World) is an opera in five acts by Paul Hindemith. The German libretto was by the composer.

The title of the opera is taken from Harmonices Mundi by the astronomer Johannes Kepler (1571–1630) who is the subject of the opera. Hindemith used the planetary system as a metaphor for his own musical arrangement of the chromatic scale.

The opera was completed in May 1957. Hindemith had previously composed a symphony of the same name in 1951.

== Performance history ==
It was first performed on 11 August 1957, at the Prinzregententheater, Munich, conducted by the composer.

A truncated monaural recording of the opera appeared on the Stradivarius label, but a complete recording of the work had to wait until the digital era, when Marek Janowski conducted the entire opera for the Wergo label (see section Recordings).

Due to Kepler's association with his home town of Linz, Austria, performances of the opera were scheduled at the Landestheater Linz beginning on April 8, 2017, and continued for several performances into June, 2017. The Bruckner Orchestra Linz was conducted by Gerrit Prießnitz.

== Roles ==
Roles, voice types, premiere cast
Role	Voice type	Premiere cast, 11 August 1957 Conductor: Paul Hindemith
Susanna, Kepler's wife/Venus	soprano	Liselotte Fölser
Young Susanna, Kepler's daughter	soprano	
Katharina, Kepler's mother/Moon	contralto	Hertha Töpper
Wallenstein, warlord/Jupiter	tenor	Richard Holm
Ulrich Grüßer, Kepler's pupil/Mars	tenor	K. Wehofschlitz
Christoph Kepler	tenor	
Johannes Kepler, the astronomer/Earth	baritone	Josef Metternich
Emperor Rudolf II/Emperor Ferdinand II/Sun	bass	Kieth Engen
Daniel Hizler, priest/Mercury	bass	Joseph Knapp
Tansur, astrologer/Saturn	bass	Marcel Cordes
Baron Starhemberg	baritone	
Richter	baritone	

== Synopsis ==
Set in the 17th century, the opera is the story of the search for universal harmony by the astronomer Johannes Kepler.

=== Plot ===
The widowed Johannes Kepler works as a mathematician and astronomer in the service of Emperor Rudolf II. The work does not satisfy him, the pay is meager, and to secure his livelihood he draws up horoscopes for wealthy citizens. The general Wallenstein is also one of his customers. He wants to know what fate the stars have in store for him in the course of the impending war.

In Linz, Kepler met his second wife, Susanne. The devout Protestant saw the Lord's Supper as merely a symbol of the body and blood of Christ, but not a true transformation of bread and wine. Because he also publicly expressed these ideas, the church forbade him from taking part in the sacrament any longer. This fact weighed heavily on his soul.

Kepler's mother Katharina is accused of being a witch. The son has to fight for six years until he finally succeeds in saving her from being burned at the stake.

Kepler's theory of celestial bodies and their orbits is not only admired by his wife and mother, he is also highly valued by his students. His assistant Ulrich Grüßer becomes a renegade among his students, jealous of Kepler's success.

In 1627, Kepler and Wallenstein met for the second time. The general asked him to enter his service and to draw up horoscopes for him on a regular basis. Wallenstein thus became Kepler's last employer.

Rudolf II's spirit darkened more and more, so that he was deposed during the war. His successor, Ferdinand II, turned out to be a weakling. When the Swedes invaded the country in 1630, the emperor called his electors to Regensburg. Kepler, who was suffering from a fatal illness, was also in the emperor's entourage. He tried to influence politics by warning them - in vain. Resigned to his fate, he died.

The last stage setting shows a baroque painting of the sky with the throne of the sun. Almost all of the characters in the opera represent celestial bodies, such as the emperor representing the sun, Johannes Kepler representing the earth, Wallenstein representing Jupiter, Tansur representing Saturn, Ulrich Grüßer representing Mars, Kepler's wife representing Venus, Daniel Hizler representing Mercury and Kepler's mother representing the moon. They all follow their orbits, as determined by nature (or by God), in a musical harmony of the world.

== Orchestra ==
=== Woodwinds ===
- 2 flutes (second doubling piccolo)
- 2 oboes
- English horn
- 2 clarinets
- Bass clarinet
- 2 bassoons
- Contrabasson

=== Brass ===
- 4 horns
- 2 trumpets
- 3 trombones
- Tuba

=== Percussion ===
- Timpani
- Percussion (4-5 players): xylophone, vibraphone, glockenspiel, triangle, 7 tubular bells, gong, suspended cymbal, cymbals, tom drum, snare drum, small drum, 2 wood blocks, bass drum

=== Strings ===
- Harp
- Strings: first and second violins, violas, cellos, and double basses

On stage: flute, two piccoli, oboe, two clarinets, bassoon, horn, three trombones, drum kit, viola, cello, and double bass.

== Music ==
Particular highlights of the work are the depiction of the witch trial with the dogged intensity of the choirs, the Electoral Diet in Regensburg and the final scene: the work ends in a large-scale passacaglia in radiant E major. The music seems baroque and modern at the same time.

== Recordings ==
In 2002 WERGO released the world premiere recording as part of their Paul Hindemith Edition. This recording was made in the Jesus-Christus-Kirche in Berlin-Dahlem in February/March 2000, with Marek Janowski conducting the Berlin Radio Symphony Orchestra, and François Le Roux in the role of Johannes Kepler.
