= Hertha Töpper =

Austrian contralto opera singer (1924–2020)

- Born: 19 April 1924; Graz
- Died: 28 March 2020 (aged 95); Munich
- Occupations: Contralto; Academic teacher
- Organizations: Bavarian State Opera; Musikhochschule München
- Title: Kammersängerin
- Awards: Bavarian Order of Merit; Order of Merit of the Federal Republic of Germany; Bavarian Maximilian Order for Science and Art

Hertha Töpper (German: [ˈhɛrta ˈtœpɐ]; 19 April 1924 – 28 March 2020) was an Austrian contralto in opera and concert, and an academic voice teacher. A member of the Bavarian State Opera, she appeared in leading roles at major international opera houses and festivals.

== Career ==
Born in Graz as the daughter of a music teacher, Töpper began her singing studies at the Graz Conservatory while still at high school. In 1945, she made her operatic debut at the Graz Opera as Ulrica in Verdi's Un ballo in maschera. She remained an ensemble member until 1952. The first Bayreuth Festival after World War II invited her in 1951 for Wagner's Ring cycle.

Also in 1951, she first performed at the Bavarian State Opera in the title role of Der Rosenkavalier by Richard Strauss. She was a member of the Bavarian State Opera from 1952 to 1981. In 1957 took part in the world premiere of Hindemith's opera Die Harmonie der Welt, and in 1972 in the premiere of Isang Yun's Sim Tjong. When the Cuvielles Theatre was reopened in 1958, she appeared as Cherubino in Mozart's Le nozze di Figaro, and for the reopening of the Nationaltheater in 1963, she was the Nurse in Die Frau ohne Schatten by Richard Strauss. Other significant roles included Dorabella in Mozart's Così fan tutte, Fricka in Das Rheingold, Brangäne in Tristan und Isolde, Magdalene in Die Meistersinger von Nürnberg, the title role in Bizet's Carmen, Lady Macbeth in Verdi's Macbeth, Eboli in Verdi's Don Carlo, Amneris in Aida, Hänsel in Humperdinck's Hänsel und Gretel, Judith in Bartok's Bluebeard's Castle and Iocaste in Stravinsky's Oedipus rex. She performed at great opera houses of the world, regularly at the Vienna State Opera, and also at La Scala in Milan, the Royal Opera House in London, La Monnaie in Brussels, in Amsterdam, Berlin, Rome, Venice and Zürich. She appeared at the Salzburg Festival in 1960, and at the Metropolitan Opera in New York City.

Besides opera, Töpper was renowned concert singer of lieder and oratorio; her collaboration with Karl Richter in the interpretation of works by Johann Sebastian Bach became reference works.

In 1949, Töpper married composer Franz Mixa (1902–1994). She was a professor of singing at the Musikhochschule München from 1971 until 1981, where Elisabeth von Magnus was among her students.

Töpper died in Munich on 28 March 2020, a few days before her 96th birthday.

== Awards ==
- 1955 Bavarian Kammersängerin
- 1962 Bavarian Order of Merit
- 1985 Order of Merit of the Federal Republic of Germany, Officer's Cross (Verdienstkreuz 1. Klasse)
- 1988 Great Cross of Honour of Styria
- 1995 Bavarian Maximilian Order for Science and Art
- 2009 Mastersingers Medal (Meistersinger-Medaille) of the Bavarian State Opera
