= Rivka Galchen =

Canadian-American writer (born 1976)

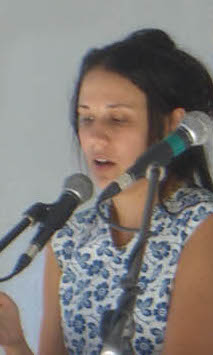
- Galchen speaking at the 2009 Brooklyn Book Festival.
- Born: April 19, 1976 (age 50); Toronto, Ontario, Canada
- Education: Princeton University (AB); Icahn School of Medicine at Mount Sinai (MD); Columbia University (MFA)
- Occupation: Writer
- Writing career
- Notable work: Atmospheric Disturbances (2008)
- Notable awards: William J. Saroyan International Prize for Fiction

Rivka Galchen (born April 19, 1976) is a Canadian American writer. Her first novel, Atmospheric Disturbances, was published in 2008 and was awarded the William Saroyan International Prize for Writing. She is the author of five books and a staff writer at The New Yorker.

== Early life ==
Galchen was born in Toronto, Ontario, to Israeli academics. When she was in preschool, her parents relocated to the United States. She grew up in Norman, Oklahoma, where her father, Tzvi Gal-chen, was a professor of meteorology at the University of Oklahoma and her mother was a computer programmer at the National Severe Storms Laboratory.

== Education ==
Galchen received her M.D. from Mount Sinai in 2003. After medical school, she earned a MFA in 2006 from Columbia University, where she was a Robert Bingham fellow.

== Career ==
In 2006, Galchen received the Rona Jaffe Foundation Writers' Award for women writers.

Her first novel, Atmospheric Disturbances, was published in May 2008. The novel was a finalist for the Mercantile Library's 2008 John Sargent, Sr., First Novel Prize, the Canadian Writers' Trust Fiction Prize, and the 2008 Governor General's Award.

Galchen teaches writing at Columbia University. In 2010, The New Yorker chose her as one of its "20 Under 40".

Galchen served as the Mary Ellen von der Heyden Fiction Fellow for the Spring 2011 term at the American Academy in Berlin. In 2015, she received a Guggenheim Fellowship.

Galchen's short-story collection American Innovations was published in 2014. It was longlisted for the 2014 Scotiabank Giller Prize and received the Danuta Gleed Literary Award. Each story is based on a well-known short story by another author, but switches the narrator from male to female and changes other elements.

In 2016, Galchen published Little Labors, a book of essays about motherhood.

In 2021, Galchen published her second novel, Everyone Knows Your Mother is a Witch. The novel was shortlisted for the 2021 Atwood Gibson Writers' Trust Fiction Prize.

Galchen writes for several national magazines, including The New Yorker, Harper's Magazine, and The New York Times Magazine. She contributes criticism and essays to the London Review of Books.

== Bibliography ==
=== Novels ===
- Atmospheric Disturbances. New York: Farrar, Straus and Giroux. 2008.
- Everyone Knows Your Mother Is a Witch. New York: Farrar, Straus and Giroux. 2021.

==== For children ====
- Rat Rule 79. New York: Restless Books. 2019.

=== Collection ===
- American Innovations: Stories. New York: Farrar, Straus and Giroux. 2014.
