= Kepler (disambiguation) =

Johannes Kepler (1571–1630) was a key figure in the scientific revolution.

Kepler may also refer to:

- Kepler (name), a surname and given name (including lists of people with the name)

== Astronomy ==
- Kepler space telescope, a NASA planet-hunting telescope launched in March 2009.
  - For exoplanets discovered by Kepler, see List of exoplanets discovered by the Kepler space telescope and Category:Exoplanets discovered by Kepler
- Johannes Kepler ATV, a European Automatic Transfer Vehicle
- 1134 Kepler, an asteroid
- Kepler (lunar crater)
- Kepler (Martian crater)
- Kepler's Supernova

== Music ==
- Kepler (band), a defunct Canadian indie rock band
- Kepler (opera), a 2009 opera by Philip Glass
- Kepler (Stefanie Sun album), a 2014 album by Stefanie Sun
- Kepler (Gemitaiz & MadMan album), 2014 studio album by Gemitaiz & MadMan
- Kep1er (K-pop girl group), formed in 2021 out of the survival show Girls Planet 999

== Places ==
- Kepler, Kentucky, a community in the United States
- Kepler Track, a hiking trail in New Zealand

== Schools ==
- Kepler (institution), the education program in Kigali, Rwanda
- Kepler College, a college in Seattle, Washington

== Technology ==
- Kepler (microarchitecture), a codename for Nvidia's GeForce 600 and 700 Series GPUs
- Kepler scientific workflow system, a software system for designing, executing, and sharing scientific workflows
- Kepler, a nickname for version 4.3 of Eclipse software development environment

== Other uses ==
- Kepler (novel), a 1981 novel by John Banville
- Johannes Kepler (film), a 1974 East German film

== See also ==
- Kepler Communications, a satellite communications company in Toronto, Ontario, Canada
- Kepler Dorsum, a feature on the Martian moon Phobos
- Kepler's Supernova, a 1604 supernova
- Kepler Interactive, a video game publisher based in London, England
- Keppler, a name
- List of things named after Johannes Kepler
- Category:Kepler objects of interest
