= Keppler =

Keppler is a name of German origin. An alternative spelling is Kaeppler, and a closely related name is Kepler. The surname Keppler may refer to:

- Adrienne L. Kaeppler (1935–2022), American anthropologist
- Bernhard Keppler (born 1956), German chemist
- Ernest Keppler (1918–2001), American politician and judge
- Georg Keppler (1894–1966), German military leader
- Herbert Keppler (1925–2008), American photographer
- Joseph Keppler (1838–1894), American cartoonist
- Reinhardt J. Keppler (1918–1942), American sailor
- Rudolph Keppler (1845–1923), German-American banker and president of the New York Stock Exchange
- Stephan Keppler (born 1983), German skier
- Udo Keppler (Joseph Keppler Jr.) (1872–1956), American cartoonist
- Victor Keppler (1904–1987), American photographer
- Wilhelm Keppler (1882–1960), German businessman

== Other uses ==
- USS Keppler, several United States Navy ships

== See also ==
- Johannes Kepler (1571–1630), German astronomer and mathematician
- Kepler (disambiguation)
- Keppel (disambiguation)
