= List of things named after Johannes Kepler =

This is a list of things named after German mathematician and astronomer Johannes Kepler (1571 – 1630).

== Geometry ==
- Kepler conjecture
- Kepler triangle
- Kepler–Bouwkamp constant
- Kepler–Poinsot polyhedron

== Celestial mechanics ==
- Kepler's laws of planetary motion
- Kepler's equation
- Keplerian elements
- Kepler orbit
- Kepler problem
- Kepler problem in general relativity

== Astronomy ==
=== Instruments and spacecraft ===
- Kepler space telescope
- Kepler photometer
- Keplerian telescope
- Kepler refractor
- Johannes Kepler ATV

=== Astronomical objects ===
Moons and Asteroids

- Kepler (lunar crater)
- Kepler (Martian crater)
- Kepler Dorsum
- 1134 Kepler

Stars

- Kepler Object of Interest
- Kepler-11
- Kepler-22
- Kepler-22b
- Kepler's Supernova

=== Computing ===
- Kepler Follow-up Program
- Kepler Input Catalog

== Software ==
- Kepler scientific workflow system

== Geography and institutions ==
- Kepler Mire
- Kepler Museum
- Kepler Track
- Kepler College
- Johannes Kepler University Linz
- Keplerplatz metro station of Vienna U-Bahn
- Kepplerstraße, a street in Frankfurt am Main

== Other ==
- Kepler (opera)
- Kepler Challenge
- Kepler (microarchitecture)
- Kep1er, a South Korean K-pop girl group
