= Kepler's =

Kepler's may refer to:

- Kepler's Books, bookstore in Menlo Park, California
- Kepler's equation in orbital mechanics
- Kepler's laws of planetary motion, describing the motion of planets around the Sun
- Kepler's Supernova, supernova in the Milky Way

== See also ==
- Kepler (disambiguation)
