= Keppel =

Keppel may refer to:

== People ==
- Alice Keppel (1869–1947), English society figure, Edward VII's last mistress, and great grandmother to Camilla, Duchess of Cornwall
- Arnold van Keppel, 1st Earl of Albemarle (1670–1718), the right-hand man of William of Orange
- Augustus Keppel, 1st Viscount Keppel (1725–1786), British admiral
- Colin Richard Keppel (1862–1947), Henry Keppel's son, British admiral
- Cynthia Keppel, American nuclear physicist
- The Hon. Sir Derek Keppel (1863-1944), British soldier and courtier
- Edwin Keppel Bennett (1887–1958), British academic
- Francis Keppel (1916–1990), American educator
- George Keppel, 3rd Earl of Albemarle (1724–1772), British general
- George Keppel (1865–1947), British Army officer, husband of Alice Keppel
- Henry Keppel (1809–1904), British admiral
- Judith Keppel (b. 1942), British, first million-pound winner on Who Wants to Be a Millionaire?
- Keppel "Kep" Enderby (1926–2015), Australian politician, cabinet minister, lawyer and judge
- Robert D. Keppel, American detective and criminal profiler known for his work with Ted Bundy
- Samuel B. Keppel (1846–1903), American politician from Pennsylvania
- Valentine S. Keppel (1865–1940), American politician
- Willem van Keppel, 2nd Earl of Albemarle (1702–1754), British soldier, diplomat and courtier
- William Keppel, 4th Earl of Albemarle (1772–1849), British aristocrat
- William Coutts Keppel, 7th Earl of Albemarle (1832–1894), British soldier and politician

== Places ==
- Hummelo en Keppel, a former municipality in the Netherlands
- Various places in Singapore named after Henry Keppel, including:
  - Keppel Bay Towers and the associated roads Keppel Bay Drive, Keppel Bay View and Keppel Bay Vista; Keppel Harbour, Keppel Hill and Keppel Road
- Keppel Island in the Falkland Islands
- Great Keppel Island in Australia
- Electoral district of Keppel in Queensland, Australia
- Keppel Island, a former name for the Tongan island of Niuatoputapu
- Keppel Street, London

== Others ==
- Keppel Union School District, a school district serving eastern Palmdale, California and its suburbs
- Keppel Ltd., a Singaporean company
- Wilson, Keppel and Betty, a British music hall act
- MV Keppel, a Scottish ferry
- A shade of cyan
