= Frans Tengnagel =

Dutch nobleman

Frans Gansneb genaamd Tengnagel van de Camp (1576 in Neede – 1 December 1622 in Vienna) was a Dutch nobleman.

He belonged to the nobel Gansneb family from Gelderland, later called ("genaamd") Tengnagel. This family had as their residence from 1553 to 1742 an estate called "De Camp" near Neede, explaining the third part of Tengnagel's name. Part of his youth he spent with his maternal grandfather at Bocholt, so that he was sometimes called a Westphalian.

He matriculated from the University of Franeker in 1593 and joined the astronomer Tycho Brahe on Uraniborg in February 1595. In 1601 he married Brahe's daughter Lisbeth. Tengnagel wrote a brief prefatory note to Johannes Kepler's astronomical treatise Astronomia Nova. From 1604 to 1606 he was a corresponding member of the Accademia dei Lincei.
