= Kepler–Bouwkamp constant =

Mathematical constant about polygons

A sequence of inscribed circles and regular polygons with increasing numbers of sides, which converge towards a circle at the limit.

In plane geometry, the Kepler–Bouwkamp constant (or polygon inscribing constant) is obtained as a limit of the following sequence. Take a circle of radius 1. Inscribe a regular triangle in this circle. Inscribe a circle in this triangle. Inscribe a square in it. Inscribe a circle, regular pentagon, circle, regular hexagon and so forth. The radius of the limiting circle is called the Kepler–Bouwkamp constant. It is named after Johannes Kepler and Christoffel Jacob Bouwkamp, and is the inverse of the polygon circumscribing constant.

== Numerical value ==
Unsolved problem in mathematics
Is the Kepler–Bouwkamp constant irrational?
More unsolved problems in mathematics

The decimal expansion of the Kepler–Bouwkamp constant is (sequence A085365 in the OEIS)
$$\prod_{k=3}^\infty \cos \frac\pi k = 0.1149420448\dots.$$
The natural logarithm of the Kepler-Bouwkamp constant is given by
$$-2\sum_{k=1}^\infty\frac{2^{2k}-1}{2k}\zeta(2k)\left(\zeta(2k)-1-\frac{1}{2^{2k}}\right)$$

where $\zeta(s) = \sum_{n=1}^{\infty} \frac{1}{n^s}$ is the Riemann zeta function.

If the product is taken over the odd primes, the constant
$$\prod_{{k\,=\,3,\,5,\,7,\atop 11,\,13,\,17,\,\ldots}} \!\!\!\cos \frac\pi k =
0.312832\ldots$$
is obtained (sequence A131671 in the OEIS).

== Related polygon-nesting problems ==
The Kepler–Bouwkamp construction places a circle between each successive pair of regular polygons. Removing these intermediate circles gives related nesting problems in which the polygons fit directly inside or around one another. The resulting limiting radii depend on whether the polygons must share a center, whether relative rotations and translations are allowed, and whether their side counts must occur in increasing order. Mathar studied direct concentric nesting with optimized rotations and selected examples allowing translation.

A 2026 preprint by Cynamon compares these geometric restrictions and also considers optimizing the order of the polygons. Its comparison uses a central equilateral triangle of circumradius one, with outward and inward nestings constructed independently. Here $R$ denotes the limiting outer-circle radius and $r$ the limiting inner-circle radius.

Outward nestings, from left to right: intermediate circles; concentric polygons with optimized rotations; optimized rotations and translations; and finite portions of a stitched order described in Cynamon's preprint. All central triangles have circumradius one. Dashed circles indicate outer limiting circles; fading is a visual aid. The panels are aligned by their outer-circle centers.

Limiting radii reported in Cynamon's preprint, with central triangle circumradius one
Construction	Order of side counts	Outer radius $R$	Inner radius $r$	$R/r$
Circles between successive polygons	Increasing: 3, 4, 5, …	4.3500183	0.11494204	37.845319
Direct concentric containment, rotations optimized	Increasing: 3, 4, 5, …	4.0961711	0.12206521	33.557236
Direct containment, rotations and translations optimized	Increasing: 3, 4, 5, …	2.4886018	0.17646707	14.10236
Direct containment, placements and order optimized	Exhaustive orders; see attainment qualification below	2.3123645	0.21622889	10.694059

Writing $K$ for the Kepler–Bouwkamp constant, the first row has $r=K$ and $R=1/(2K)$. The reciprocal $1/K\approx8.7000366$ instead describes the outward circle-interposed construction starting from a unit circle, whose surrounding triangle has circumradius two. Thus the factor of two reflects a different normalization. The concentric values in the second row incorporate a correction to Mathar's rotated adjacent product presented in Section 3.2 of Cynamon's preprint.

For the final row, the preprint reports an infimum for the outward radius and a supremum for the inward radius over ordinary exhaustive sequences, with neither attained by an ordinary permutation of the side counts. It describes attainment in a larger class of countable stitched orders, consisting of infinite polygon chains joined at limiting circles. The initial outward chain has side counts $3,6,12,24,\ldots$. Such a chain has no last polygon, and a following block can approach the shared limiting circle without having a first polygon. These limiting circles are geometric boundaries between blocks, not additional polygons in the ordering.
