= USS Keppler =

USS Keppler has been the name of more than one United States Navy ship, and may refer to:

- USS Keppler (DE-311), a destroyer escort canceled during construction in 1944
- USS Keppler (DE-375), a destroyer escort canceled during construction in 1944
- USS Keppler (DD-765), a Gearing-class destroyer in commission from 1947 to 1972
