= Samuel B. Keppel =

American politician (1846–1903)

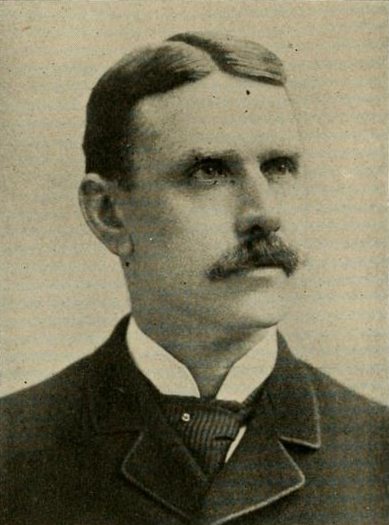
- Keppel in a 1893 publication

Member of the Pennsylvania House of Representatives from the Berks County district
- In office 1891–1894

Personal details
- Born: December 10, 1846 Honey Brook Township, Pennsylvania, U.S.
- Died: April 18, 1903 (aged 56) Sinking Spring, Pennsylvania, U.S.
- Resting place: Sinking Spring Cemetery
- Party: Democratic
- Education: Millersville University of Pennsylvania
- Occupation: Politician; educator; businessman

Samuel B. Keppel (December 10, 1846 – April 18, 1903) was an American politician from Pennsylvania. He served as a member of the Pennsylvania House of Representatives, representing Berks County from 1891 to 1894.

== Early life ==
Samuel B. Keppel was born on December 10, 1846, in Honey Brook Township, Pennsylvania. He attended Waynesburg Academy and Millersville State Normal School (later Millersville University of Pennsylvania).

== Career ==
Keppel worked as a teacher for six years in Berks and Lancaster counties. He was a telegrapher for Philadelphia and Reading Railroad Company for two years. From 1872 to 1877, he was a telegrapher and clerk for Moselem Iron Company (or Moselem Furnace) in Moselem. On April 1, 1877, he moved to Sinking Spring and started working in the coal, lumber and grain business. On April 1, 1881, he began working in the same business in Robesonia. He operated the business with C. D. Reber as Keppel & Reber until 1886 when Reber retired. He then operated the business individually. He was director of Citizen's Bank in Reading starting with its organization in May 1888. He was also a contractor and builder. In April 1892, he formed the company Brooke Milling Company in Birdsboro. He leased the mill and served as the company's treasurer and secretary.

Keppel was a Democrat. He served as a member of the Pennsylvania House of Representatives, representing Berks County from 1891 to 1894. He was also school director.

Keppel was president of the Reading and Womelsdorf Electric Railway. He was director of the Colonial Trust Company and the Second National Bank of Reading. He was secretary and treasurer of Sinking Spring Water Company. He was president of Sinking Spring Foundry Company. He was owner and proprietor of Bello Alto Hotel, a summer resort on South Mountain. He was director of the Manatawny Mutual Fire and Storm Insurance Company and became an agent of the Mutual and Stock Fire Insurance Company in 1881.

== Personal life ==
Keppel married twice. He married Eva. His daughter was Mrs. William S. Delp. He was a member of the St. John Reformed Church in Sinking Spring.

Keppel died of heart failure on April 18, 1903, at his home in Sinking Spring. He was interred in Sinking Spring Cemetery.
