= Kepler (name) =

Kepler is both a surname and a masculine given name. Notable people with the name include:

Surname:

- Angela Kepler (born 1943), New Zealand–born American writer
- Johannes Kepler (1571–1630), German mathematician, astronomer and astrologer
- Katharina Kepler (1546–1622), German witchcraft accusation victim and mother of Johannes Kepler
- Lars Kepler, the pen name for writers Alexander Ahndoril and Alexandra Coelho Ahndoril
- Max Kepler (born 1993), German baseball player
- Shell Kepler (1958–2008), American actress

Given name:

- Kepler Bradley (born 1985), Australian rules footballer
- Kepler Orellana (born 1977), Venezuelan tennis player
- Kepler Wessels (born 1957), South African cricketer
- Képler Laveran Lima Ferreira (born 1983), Brazilian-born Portuguese footballer (a.k.a. Pepe)

== See also ==
- Keplar B. Johnson (1896–1972), American architect
