= 1134 Kepler =

Asteroid

(1134) Kepler
Discovery
- Discovered by: M. F. Wolf
- Discovery site: Heidelberg Obs.
- Discovery date: 25 September 1929

Designations
- Named after: Johannes Kepler (astronomer)
- Alternative designations: 1929 SA · 1951 SA
- Minor planet category: Mars-crosser

Orbital characteristics
- Epoch 16 February 2017 (JD 2457800.5)
- Uncertainty parameter 0
- Observation arc: 86.62 yr (31,638 days)
- Aphelion: 3.9338 AU
- Perihelion: 1.4219 AU
- Semi-major axis: 2.6779 AU
- Eccentricity: 0.4690
- Orbital period (sidereal): 4.38 yr (1,601 days)
- Mean anomaly: 320.25°
- Mean motion: 0° 13^{m} 29.64^{s} / day
- Inclination: 15.312°
- Longitude of ascending node: 5.7988°
- Argument of perihelion: 332.89°
- Earth MOID: 0.4329 AU

Physical characteristics
- Dimensions: 4±1 km (generic)
- Synodic rotation period: 0.1148 day
- Spectral type: SMASS = S
- Absolute magnitude (H): 14.2

1134 Kepler, provisional designation 1929 SA, is a stony asteroid and eccentric Mars-crosser from the asteroid belt, approximately 4 kilometers in diameter. It was discovered on 25 September 1929, by German astronomer Max Wolf at Heidelberg Observatory in southwest Germany. It is named after Johannes Kepler.

== Orbit and classification ==
Kepler orbits the Sun at a distance of 1.4–3.9 AU once every 4 years and 5 months (1,601 days). Its orbit has an eccentricity of 0.47 and an inclination of 15° with respect to the ecliptic. The body's observation arc begins at Heidelberg, the night after its official discovery observation.

== Physical characteristics ==
In the SMASS taxonomy, Kepler is a stony S-type asteroid.

=== Diameter and albedo ===
Its diameter has not been estimated by any of the prominent space-based surveys such as the Infrared Astronomical Satellite IRAS (1982), the Japanese Akari satellite (2006), NASA's Wide-field Infrared Survey Explorer (2009) or its subsequent NEOWISE mission (2013). Based on a generic magnitude-to-diameter conversion, Kepler's diameter is between 3 and 8 kilometer for an absolute magnitude of 14.2 and an assumed albedo in the range of 0.25 to 0.05. Since its spectral type falls into the class of stony asteroids, which have an averaged standard albedo around 0.20, Kepler's generic diameter is close to 4 kilometers, as the higher a body's albedo (reflectivity), the shorter its diameter at a fixed absolute magnitude (brightness).

Kepler's rotation period is 0.1148 day, a pretty common value for asteroids of this size.

== Naming ==
This minor planet was named on the commemoration of the 300th death anniversary of astronomer Johannes Kepler (1571–1630), best known for his laws of planetary motion. Kepler is also honored by a lunar and Martian crater, by Kepler Dorsum – a mountain ridge on the Martian moon Phobos, and by Kepler's Supernova.

Naming citation was first published in 1930, in the astronomy journal Astronomical Notes (AN 240, 135). The space observatory Kepler and its many discovered exoplanets also bear his name (see also Kepler (disambiguation)).
