= Kepler College =

Online astrology certificate program

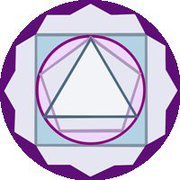
- Kepler College Astrological Education
- Former names: Kepler College of Astrological Arts and Sciences
- Type: Online certificate program, unaccredited
- Established: 2000
- Location: Seattle, Washington, U.S.
- Website: www.keplercollege.org

Kepler College (formerly Kepler College of Astrological Arts and Sciences) is an online vocational institution for the study of astrology. While historically based in Seattle, Washington, U.S., it now operates exclusively online. It is named after the mathematician and astronomer Johannes Kepler (1571–1630).

Kepler College was founded in 2000 as an unaccredited institution of higher learning that was authorized to grant degrees from 2000 until 2010 by the Higher Education Coordinating Board of Washington State. Its programs were based in the liberal arts and it offered degrees in astrological studies with a focus on the history of astrology. Since 2010, students have been awarded certificates of completion of a course of study, plus a diploma (KPDA - Kepler Professional Diploma in Astrology) and an advanced diploma (Kepler Advanced Professional Diploma in Astrology).

== History ==
In March 2000, Kepler College received provisional authorization from Washington State's Higher Education Coordinating (HEC) Board to grant degrees while the school pursued regional or national accreditation, a requirement for maintaining degree-granting status.

The HEC Board's decision was criticized by many academics due to Kepler's focus on astrology. An administrator at the University of Washington called the HEC Board's approval "ludicrous" and compared the study of astrology to "quack medicine". John Silber, chancellor of Boston University, wrote in a Boston Herald editorial that the school's promoters "honored Kepler not for his strength but for his weakness, as if a society advocating drunkenness named a school for Ernest Hemingway". Silber also said, "The fact is that astrology, whether judged by its theory or its practice, is bunkum. In a free society there is no reason to prevent those who wish to learn nonsense from finding teachers who want to make money peddling nonsense. But it is inexcusable for the government to certify teachers of nonsense as competent or to authorize—that is, endorse—the granting of degrees in nonsense."

Kepler College promoted itself as the only institution in the Western Hemisphere to offer bachelor's and master's degrees in astrological studies and 31 students enrolled for the first term in July 2000. The majority of coursework was offered online, allowing students from across the U.S. to enroll with the requirement that they were present in-person for one week of the 11-week term.

Kepler College did not obtain the required accreditation status by 2010 and as a result, the HEC Board revoked Kepler's right to grant degrees. Following the expiration of its degree-granting authority in 2012, Kepler College transitioned to an online-only format focusing on professional education. It currently awards the Kepler Professional Diploma in Astrology (KPDA) and the Kepler Advanced Professional Diploma in Astrology (KAPDA), along with specialized certificates in areas such as Natal and Prediction Fundamentals, AstroMapping, and historical traditions including Hellenistic and Medieval astrology .
