= Kepler (opera) =

2009 opera by Philip Glass

- Opera by Philip Glass
- Glass in 2007
- Librettist: Martina Winkel
- Language: German; Latin
- Based on: life of Johannes Kepler
- Premiere: 20 September 2009; Landestheater Linz

Kepler is an opera by Philip Glass set to a libretto in German and Latin by Martina Winkel. It premiered on 20 September 2009 at the Landestheater in the Austrian city of Linz with Dennis Russell Davies conducting the Bruckner Orchestra. Its libretto is based on the life and work of Johannes Kepler, the 16th and 17th century mathematician and astronomer. The work was commissioned by the Linz Landestheater and Linz09 (a programme celebrating the city's designation as a European Capital of Culture). The opera was performed in the USA for the first time in May 2012 at the Spoleto Festival USA; it was conducted by John Kennedy and directed by Sam Helfrich, featuring an English translation by Saskia M. Wesnigk-Wood.

This is the third opera by Glass to be inspired by a physicist, after Einstein on the Beach (1976) and Galileo Galilei (2002).

== Synopsis ==
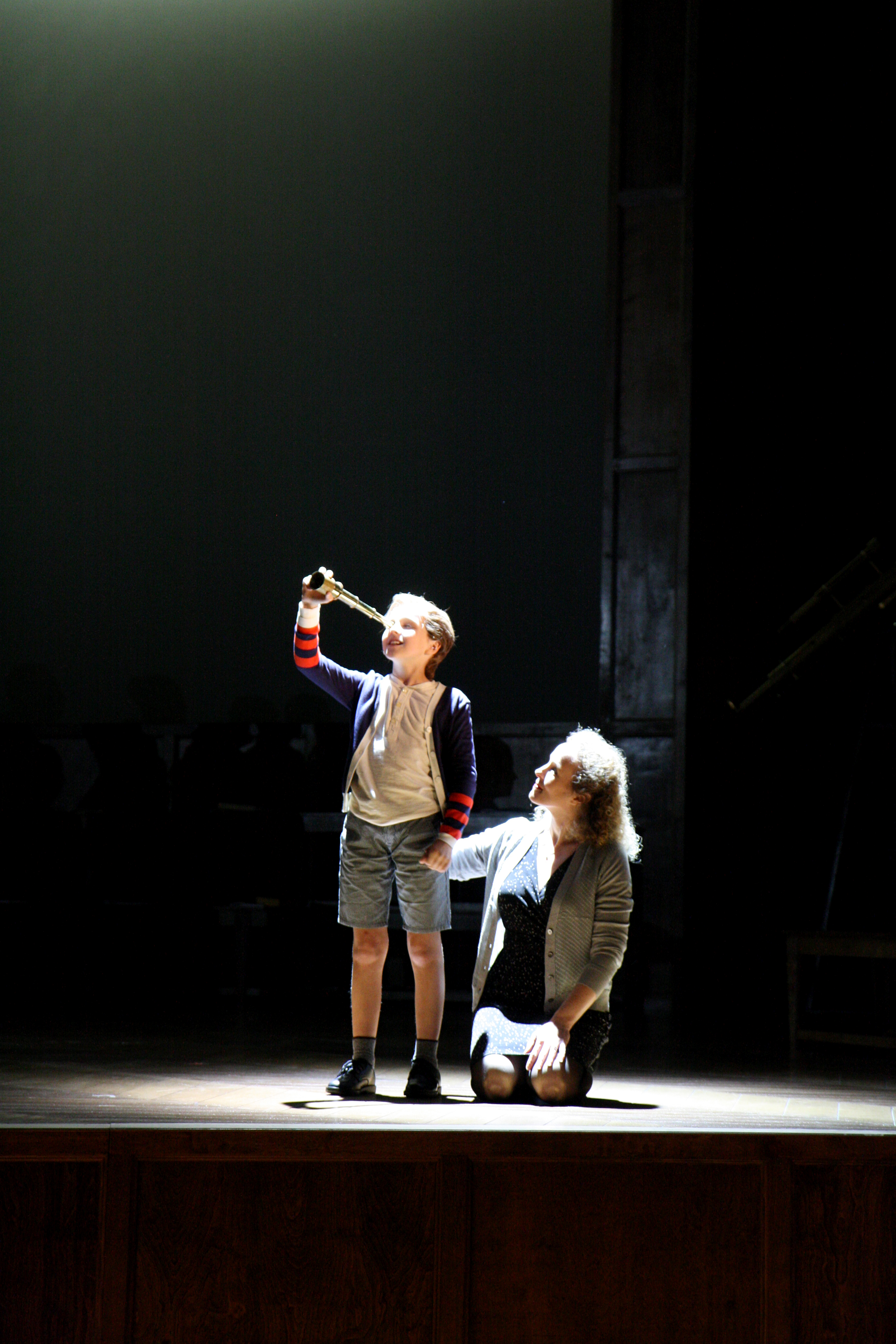
A young Kepler looks through a telescope with his mother Katharina, scene from the opera

"Fragments from the life and ideas of the scientist Johannes Kepler are contrasted with segments from the story of creation and poems by Andreas Gryphius, which portray Europe during the Thirty Years War."

=== Act 1 ===
- Prologue
- I. Questions 1
- II. Polyeder
- III. Genesis
- IV. Gryphius —Auf die Nacht (Upon the Night)
- V. Physica Coelestis
- VI. Gryphius 2
- VII. Questions 2
- VIII. Gryphius 3—Eyes. Optical Paradox

=== Act 2 ===
- I. On Astrology
- II. Gryphius 4—To the Stars
- III. Hypotheses
- IV. Gryphius 5:—Tears of the Fatherland
- V. Ephemerides
- Epilogue
