= Johannes Kepler =

German astronomer and mathematician (1571–1630)

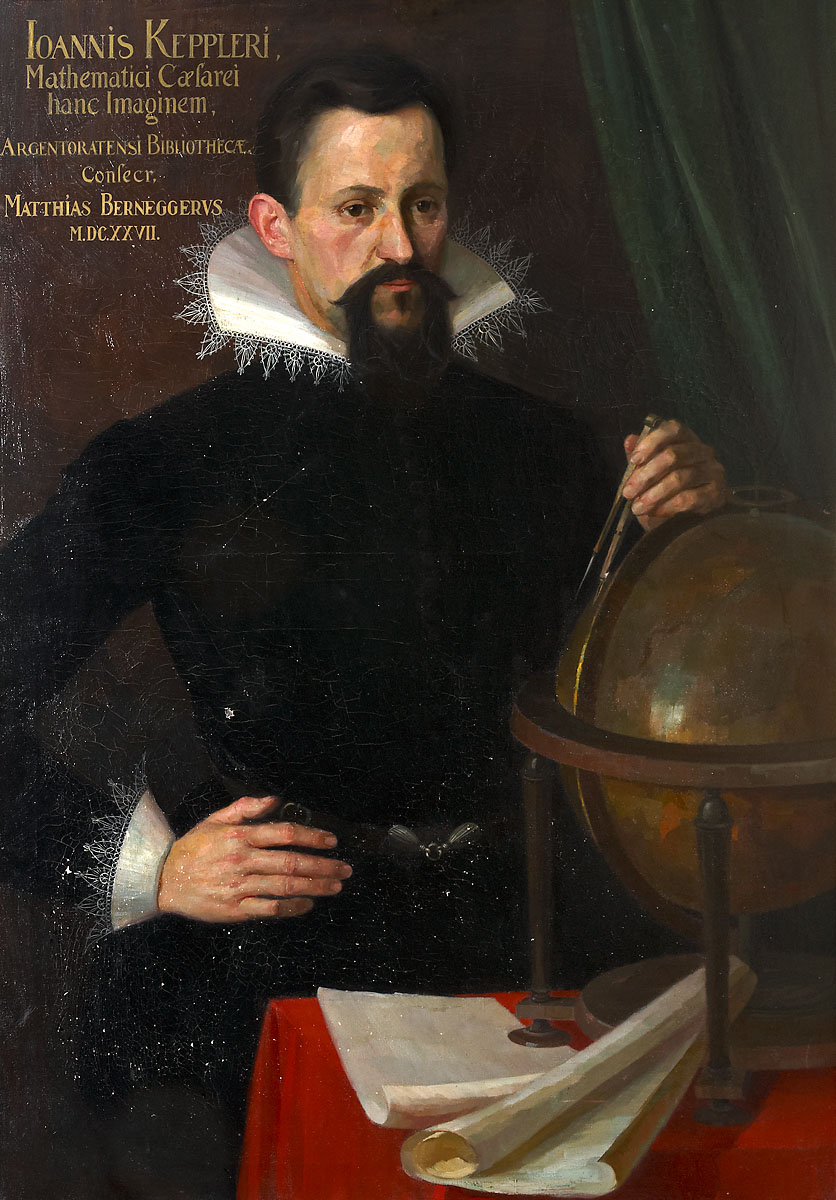
- Portrait, c. 1910, after 1620 original
- Born: 27 December 1571; Free Imperial City of Weil der Stadt, Holy Roman Empire
- Died: 15 November 1630 (aged 58); Free Imperial City of Regensburg, Holy Roman Empire
- Education: Tübinger Stift (MA)
- Known for: Kepler's laws of planetary motion; Kepler conjecture; Kepler's equation; Rudolphine Tables
- Scientific career
- Fields: astronomy; astrology; mathematics; natural philosophy
- Academic advisors: Michael Maestlin

Johannes Kepler (Note: English: /ˈkɛplər/ KEP-lər; German: [joˈhanəs ˈkɛplɐ].) (27 December 1571 – 15 November 1630) was a German polymath who was an astronomer, mathematician, astrologer, natural philosopher and music theorist. He is a key figure in the 17th-century Scientific Revolution, best known for his laws of planetary motion, and his books Astronomia nova, Harmonice Mundi, and Epitome Astronomiae Copernicanae. The variety and impact of his work made Kepler one of the founders and fathers of modern astronomy, the scientific method, natural science, and modern science. He has been described as the "father of science fiction" for his novel Somnium.

Kepler was a mathematics teacher at a seminary school in Graz, where he became an associate of Prince Hans Ulrich von Eggenberg. Later he became an assistant to the astronomer Tycho Brahe in Prague, and eventually the imperial mathematician to Emperor Rudolf II and his two successors Matthias and Ferdinand II. He also taught mathematics in Linz, and was an adviser to General Wallenstein.

Kepler lived in an era when there was no clear distinction between astronomy and astrology, but there was a strong division between astronomy (a branch of mathematics within the liberal arts) and physics (a branch of natural philosophy). Kepler also incorporated religious arguments and reasoning into his work, motivated by the religious conviction and belief that God had created the world according to an intelligible plan that is accessible through the natural light of reason. Kepler described his new astronomy as "celestial physics", as "an excursion into Aristotle's Metaphysics", and as "a supplement to Aristotle's On the Heavens", transforming the ancient tradition of physical cosmology by treating astronomy as part of a universal mathematical physics. Additionally, he did fundamental work in the field of optics, being named the father of modern optics, in particular for his Astronomiae pars optica. He also invented an improved version of the refracting telescope, the Keplerian telescope, which became the foundation of the modern refracting telescope, while also improving on the telescope design by Galileo Galilei, who mentioned Kepler's discoveries in his work. He postulated the Kepler conjecture. Kepler influenced among others Isaac Newton, providing one of the foundations for his theory of universal gravitation.

== Early life ==
=== Childhood (1571–1590) ===
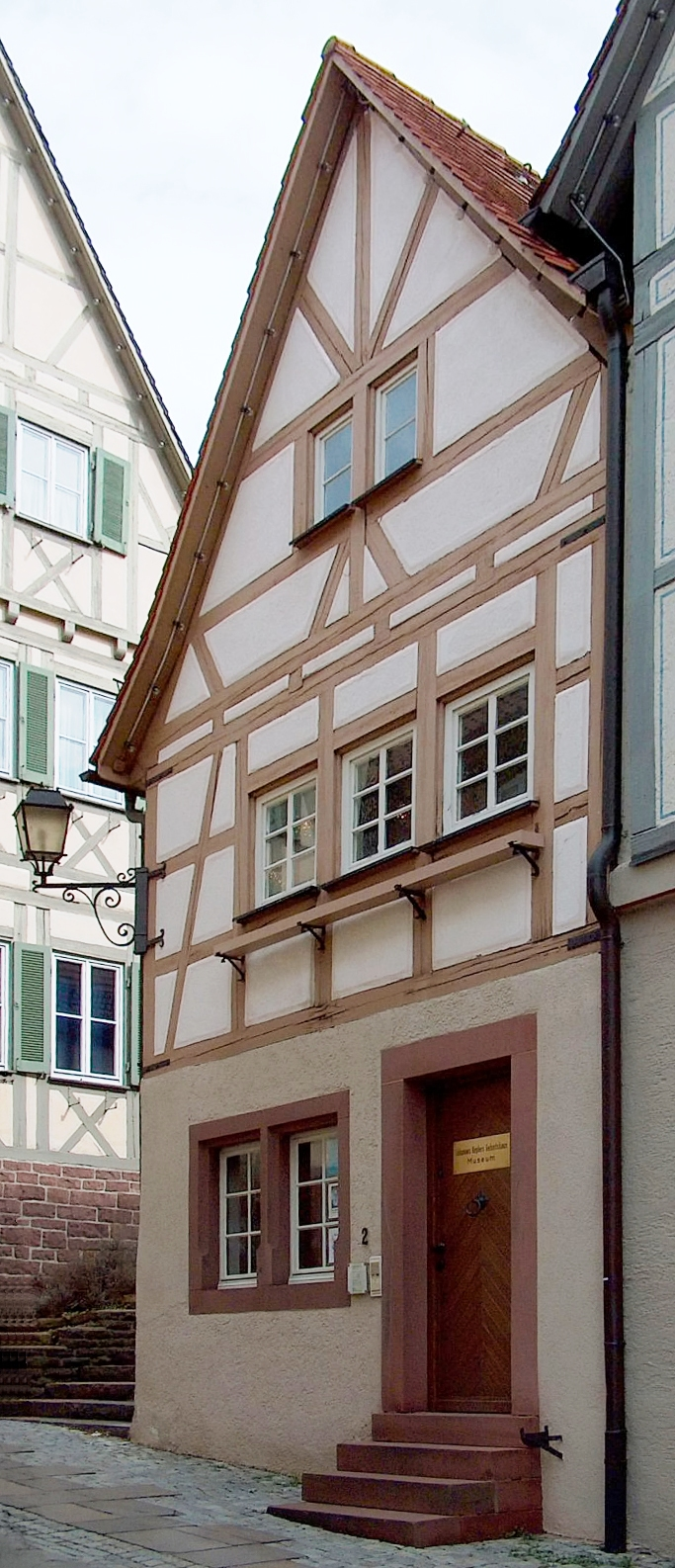
Kepler's birthplace, in Weil der Stadt, Germany

Kepler was born on 27 December 1571, in the Free Imperial City of Weil der Stadt (now part of the Stuttgart Region in the German state of Baden-Württemberg). His parents were Lutheran, but it is presumed that he was baptized a Catholic, as Protestant baptisms were not permitted in Weil at that time. His grandfather, Sebald Kepler, had been Lord Mayor of the city. By the time Johannes was born, the Kepler family fortune was in decline. His father, Heinrich Kepler, earned a precarious living as a mercenary, and he left the family when Johannes was five years old. He was believed to have died in the Eighty Years' War in the Netherlands where, although a Protestant, he was fighting in the Catholic Spanish army. His mother, Katharina Guldenmann, an innkeeper's daughter, was a healer and herbalist. Johannes had six siblings, of which two brothers and one sister survived to adulthood. Born prematurely, he claimed to have been weak and sickly as a child. Nevertheless, he often impressed travelers at his grandfather's inn with his phenomenal mathematical faculty.

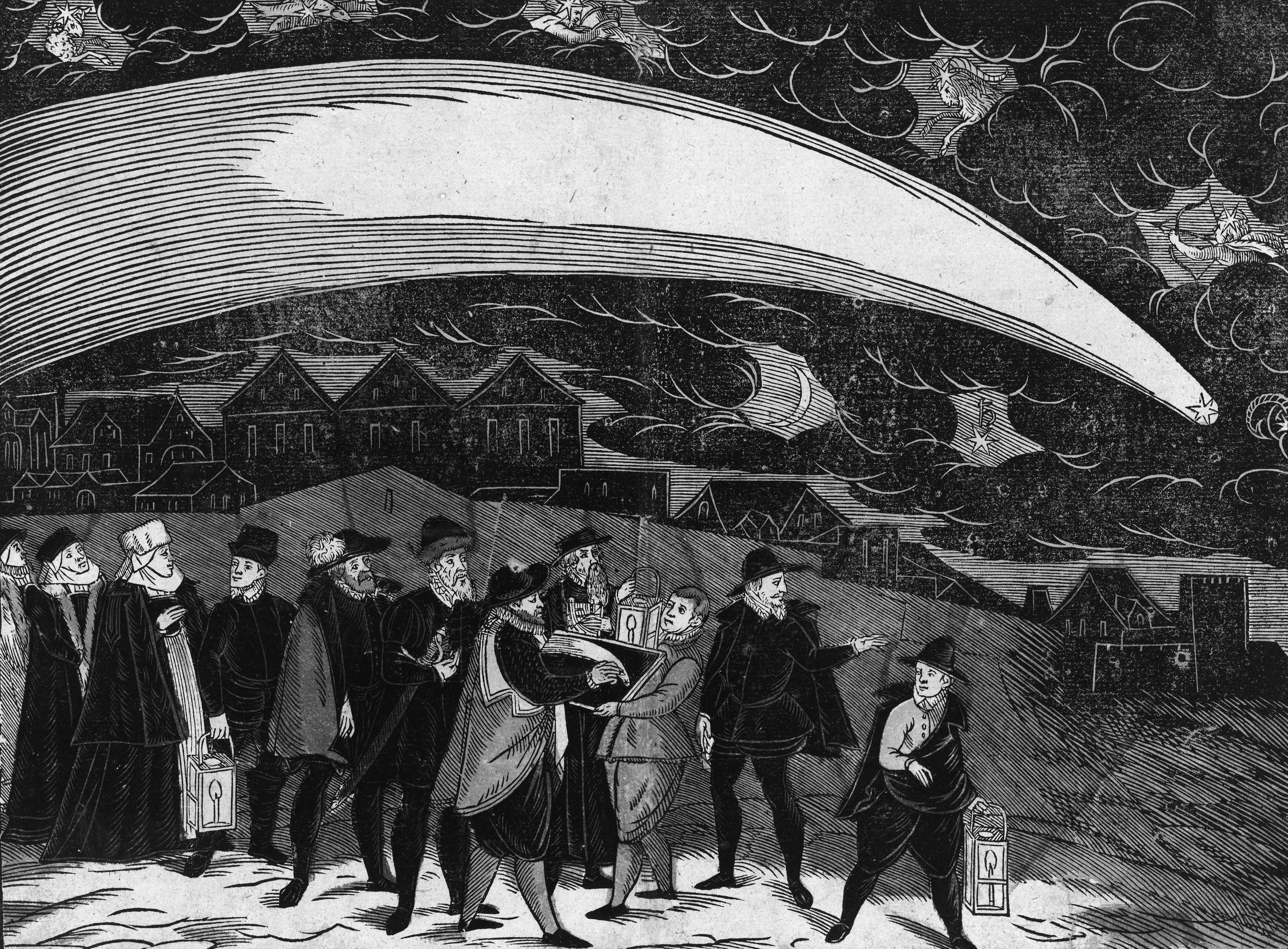
As a child, Kepler witnessed the Great Comet of 1577, which attracted the attention of astronomers across Europe.

He was introduced to astronomy at an early age and developed a strong passion for it that would span his entire life. At age six, he observed the Great Comet of 1577, writing that he "was taken by [his] mother to a high place to look at it." In 1580, at age nine, he observed another astronomical event, a lunar eclipse, recording that he remembered being "called outdoors" to see it and that the Moon "appeared quite red". However, childhood smallpox left him with weak vision and crippled hands, limiting his ability in the observational aspects of astronomy.

Kepler attended the Grammar School in Weil until 1577, when the family moved to Leonberg in Protestant Württemberg. He attended the elementary German school in Leonberg for a year, and then the Latin Grammar School, where all lessons and books were in Latin. He was then at two monastic schools, from 1584 in Adelberg, and from 1586 at the seminary at Maulbronn. In September 1589, Kepler entered the Tübinger Stift at the University of Tübingen, a seminary which served to prepare Lutheran pastors for Württemberg. There, he studied philosophy under Vitus Müller and theology under Jacob Heerbrand (a student of Philipp Melanchthon at Wittenberg), who also taught Michael Maestlin while he was a student, until he became Chancellor at Tübingen in 1590. He proved himself to be a superb mathematician and earned a reputation as a skillful astrologer, casting horoscopes for fellow students. Under the instruction of Michael Maestlin, Tübingen's professor of mathematics from 1583 to 1631, he learned both the Ptolemaic system and the Copernican system of planetary motion. He became a Copernican at that time. In a student disputation, he defended heliocentrism from both a theoretical and theological perspective, maintaining that the Sun was the principal source of motive power in the universe. Despite his desire to become a minister in the Lutheran church, he was denied ordination because of beliefs contrary to the Formula of Concord, the Lutheran statement of faith which had been adopted in 1577. Near the end of his studies, Kepler was recommended for a position as teacher of mathematics and astronomy at the Protestant school in Graz, in Styria, Inner Austria. He accepted the position in April 1594, at the age of 22.

=== Graz (1594–1600) ===
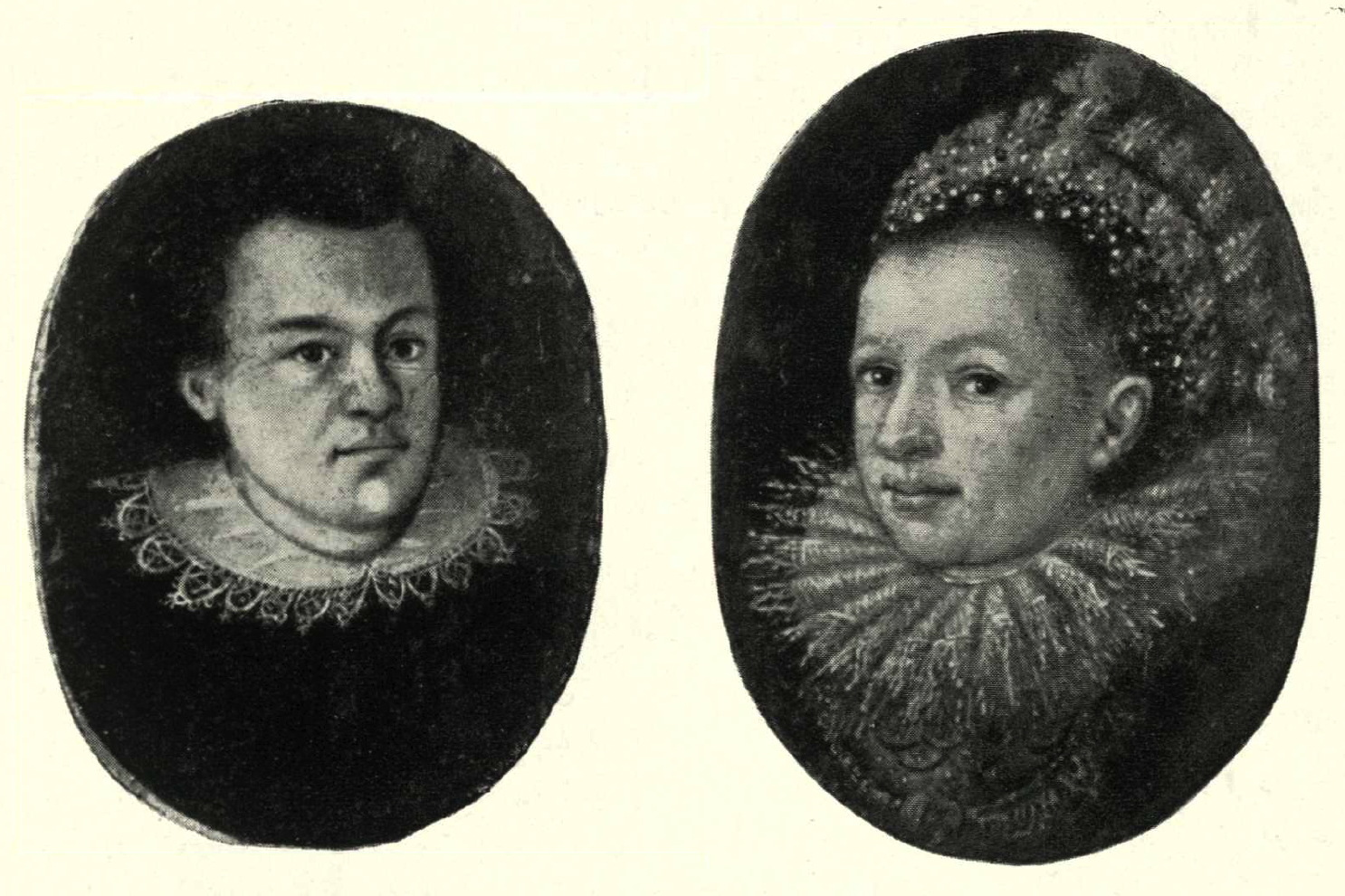
Oil on copper portraits of Kepler and his wife, c. 1600

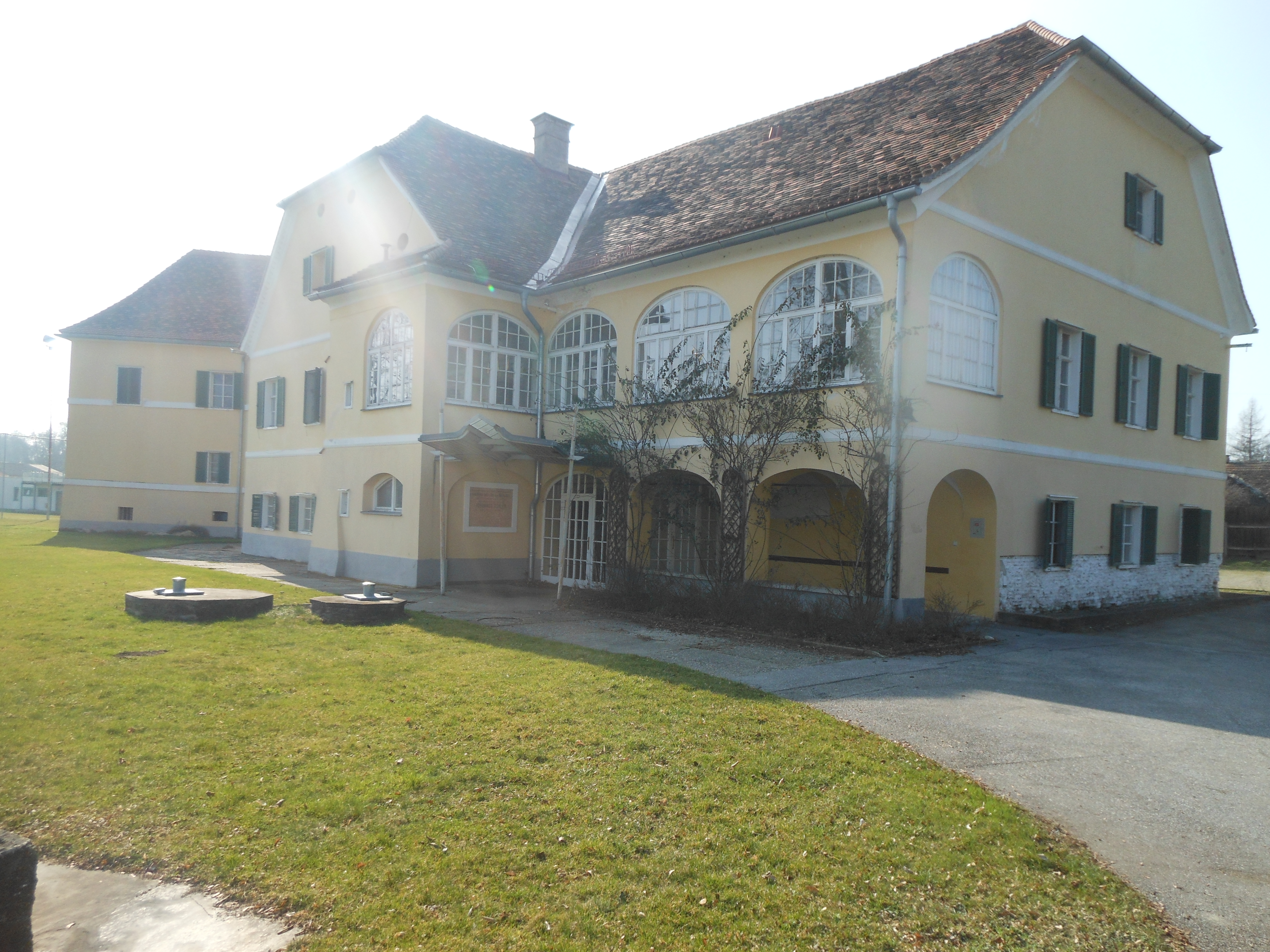
House of Kepler and Barbara Müller in Gössendorf, near Graz (1597–1599)

During his time in Graz (1594–1600), he issued many official calendars and prognostications that enhanced his reputation as an astrologer. Although Kepler had mixed feelings about astrology and disparaged many customary practices of astrologers, he believed deeply in a connection between the cosmos and the individual. He eventually published some of the ideas he had entertained while a student in the Mysterium Cosmographicum (1596), published a little over a year after his arrival at Graz.

In December 1595, Kepler was introduced to Barbara Müller, a 23-year-old widow (twice over) with a young daughter, Regina Lorenz, and he began courting her. Müller, an heiress to the estates of her late husbands, was also the daughter of a successful mill owner. Her father Jobst initially opposed a marriage. Even though Kepler had inherited his grandfather's nobility, Kepler's poverty made him an unacceptable match. Jobst relented after Kepler completed work on Mysterium, but the engagement nearly fell apart while Kepler was away tending to the details of publication. However, Protestant officials—who had helped set up the match—pressured the Müllers to honor their agreement. Barbara and Johannes were married on 27 April 1597.

In the first years of their marriage, the Keplers had two children (Heinrich and Susanna), both of whom died in infancy. In 1602, they had a daughter (Susanna); in 1604, a son (Friedrich); and in 1607, another son (Ludwig).

==== Other research ====
Following the publication of Mysterium and with the blessing of the Graz school inspectors, Kepler began an ambitious program to extend and elaborate his work. He planned four additional books: one on the stationary aspects of the universe (the Sun and the fixed stars); one on the planets and their motions; one on the physical nature of planets and the formation of geographical features (focused especially on Earth); and one on the effects of the heavens on the Earth, to include atmospheric optics, meteorology, and astrology.

He also sought the opinions of many of the astronomers to whom he had sent Mysterium, among them Reimarus Ursus (Nicolaus Reimers Bär)—the imperial mathematician to Rudolf II and a bitter rival of Tycho Brahe. Ursus did not reply directly, but republished Kepler's flattering letter to pursue his priority dispute over (what is now called) the Tychonic system with Tycho. Despite this black mark, Tycho also began corresponding with Kepler, starting with a harsh but legitimate critique of Kepler's system; among a host of objections, Tycho took issue with the use of inaccurate numerical data taken from Copernicus. Through their letters, Tycho and Kepler discussed a broad range of astronomical problems, dwelling on lunar phenomena and Copernican theory (particularly its theological viability). But without the significantly more accurate data of Tycho's observatory, Kepler had no way to address many of these issues.

Instead, he turned his attention to chronology and "harmony", the numerological relationships among music, mathematics and the physical world, and their astrological consequences. By assuming the Earth to possess a soul (a property he would later invoke to explain how the Sun causes the motion of planets), he established a speculative system connecting astrological aspects and astronomical distances to weather and other earthly phenomena. By 1599, however, he again felt his work limited by the inaccuracy of available data—just as growing religious tension was also threatening his continued employment in Graz.

==== Expulsion from Graz ====
Graz was a largely Protestant, mostly Lutheran, city, while the ruler of Inner Austria was a Catholic Habsburg. In 1578, Duke Charles II had granted considerable privileges to Protestants in the Pacification of Bruck. Charles died in 1590, when his son and heir Ferdinand II was 12 years old. Ferdinand was educated in the Jesuit College and University of Ingolstadt, and became full ruler of Inner Austria in 1596. He travelled to Italy in 1598, and returned with a determination to restore the true Catholic faith and eliminate heresy. Kepler wrote to a friend in June of that year expressing his foreboding for the future. As Ferdinand's biographer Robert L. Bireley wrote, his fears were justified, as the Counter-Reformation gained strength.

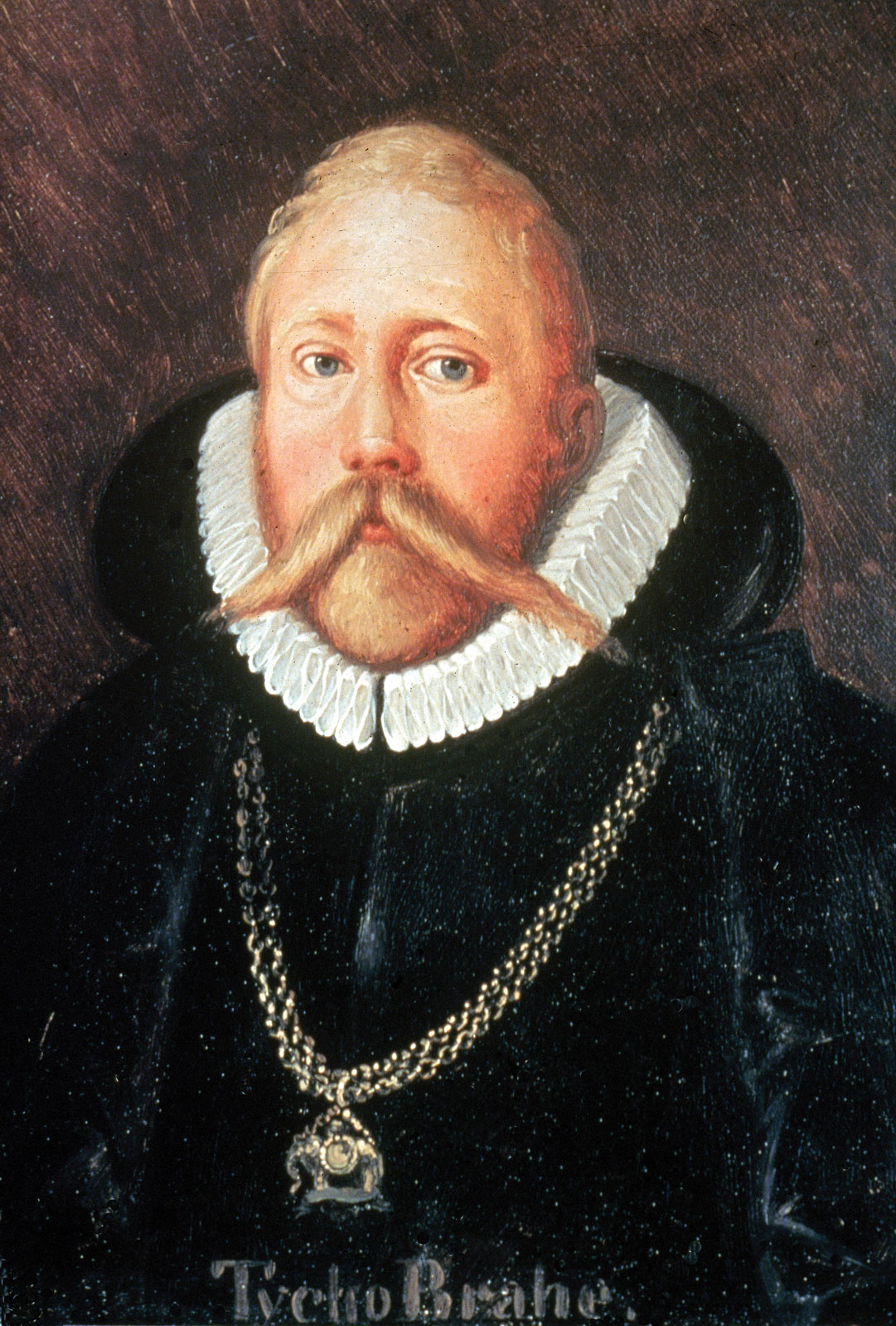
Tycho Brahe

In September 1598, Ferdinand ordered all Protestant preachers and teachers to leave the country. Kepler was exempted from the decree, but did not feel secure, and looked for alternatives. He learned that Tycho Brahe had been appointed Imperial Mathematician in Prague, and Kepler re-established contact. In December 1599, Tycho invited Kepler to visit him in Prague; on 1 January 1600 (before he even received the invitation), Kepler set off in the hopes that Tycho's patronage could solve his philosophical problems as well as his social and financial ones. On 4 February 1600, Kepler met Tycho Brahe and his assistants Franz Tengnagel and Longomontanus at Benátky nad Jizerou (35 km from Prague), the site where Tycho's new observatory was being constructed. Over the next two months, he stayed as a guest, analyzing some of Tycho's observations of Mars; Tycho guarded his data closely, but was impressed by Kepler's theoretical ideas and soon allowed him more access. Kepler planned to test his theory from Mysterium Cosmographicum based on the Mars data, but he estimated that the work would take up to two years (since he was not allowed to simply copy the data for his own use). With the help of Johannes Jessenius, Kepler attempted to negotiate a more formal employment arrangement with Tycho, but negotiations broke down in an angry argument and Kepler left for Prague on 6 April. Kepler and Tycho soon reconciled and eventually reached an agreement on salary and living arrangements, and in June, Kepler returned home to Graz to collect his family.

The situation in Graz made it impossible to return immediately to Brahe; in hopes of continuing his astronomical studies, Kepler sought an appointment as a mathematician to Duke Ferdinand. To that end, Kepler composed an essay—dedicated to Ferdinand—in which he proposed a force-based theory of lunar motion: "In Terra inest virtus, quae Lunam ciet" ("There is a force in the earth which causes the moon to move"). Though the essay did not earn him a place in Ferdinand's court, it did detail a new method for measuring lunar eclipses, which he applied during the 10 July eclipse in Graz. These observations formed the basis of his explorations of the laws of optics that would culminate in Astronomiae Pars Optica. Then on 17 July a new decree was announced, ordering all inhabitants to renounce the Protestant faith or leave the province. This time there was no exception for Kepler, and he and his wife and step-daughter left Graz for Prague on 30 September 1600.

== Scientific career ==
=== Prague (1600–1612) ===
Once established in Prague, he was supported directly by Tycho, who assigned him to analyzing planetary observations and writing a tract against Tycho's (by then deceased) rival, Ursus. In September, Tycho secured him a commission as a collaborator on the new project he had proposed to the emperor: the Rudolphine Tables that should replace the Prutenic Tables of Erasmus Reinhold. Two days after Tycho's unexpected death on 24 October 1601, Kepler was appointed his successor as the imperial mathematician with the responsibility to complete his unfinished work. The next 11 years as imperial mathematician would be the most productive of his life.

=== Imperial Advisor ===
Kepler's primary obligation as imperial mathematician was to provide astrological advice to the emperor, Rudolf II. Though Kepler took a dim view of the attempts of contemporary astrologers to precisely predict the future or divine specific events, he had been casting well-received detailed horoscopes for friends, family, and patrons since his time as a student in Tübingen. In addition to horoscopes for allies and foreign leaders, the emperor sought Kepler's advice in times of political trouble. Rudolf was actively interested in the work of many of his court scholars (including numerous alchemists) and kept up with Kepler's work in physical astronomy as well.

Officially, the only acceptable religious doctrines in Prague were Catholic and Utraquist, but Kepler's position in the imperial court allowed him to practice his Lutheran faith unhindered. The emperor nominally provided an ample income for his family, but the difficulties of the over-extended imperial treasury meant that actually getting hold of enough money to meet financial obligations was a continual struggle. Partly because of financial troubles, his life at home with Barbara was unpleasant, marred with bickering and bouts of sickness. Court life, however, brought Kepler into contact with other prominent scholars (Johannes Matthäus Wackher von Wackhenfels, Jost Bürgi, David Fabricius, Martin Bachazek, and Johannes Brengger, among others) and astronomical work proceeded rapidly.

=== Supernova of 1604 ===
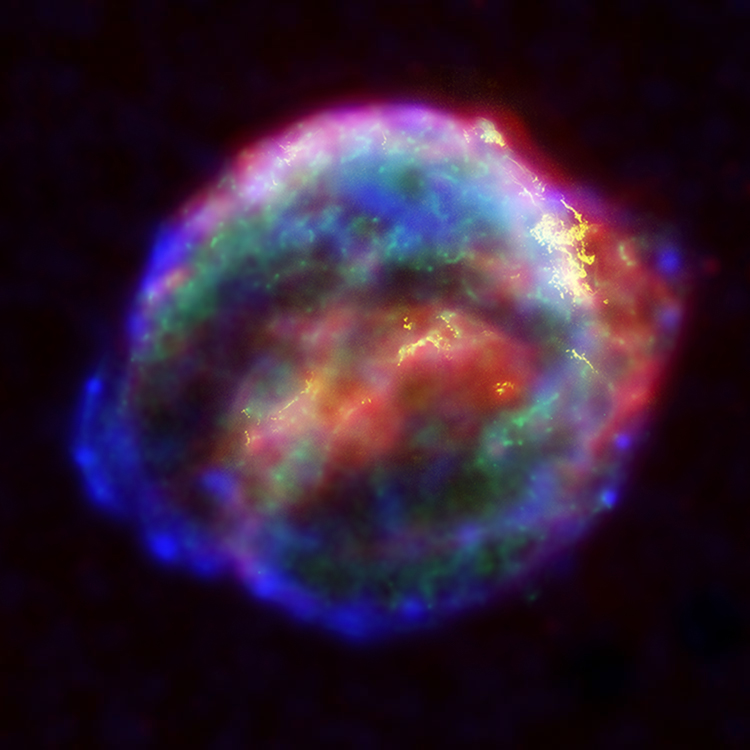
Remnant of Kepler's Supernova SN 1604

In October 1604, a bright new evening star (SN 1604) appeared, but Kepler did not believe the rumors until he saw it himself. Kepler began systematically observing the supernova. Astrologically, the end of 1603 marked the beginning of a fiery trigon, the start of the about 800-year cycle of great conjunctions; astrologers associated the two previous such periods with the rise of Charlemagne (c. 800 years earlier) and the birth of Christ (c. 1600 years earlier), and thus expected events of great portent, especially regarding the emperor.

It was in this context, as the imperial mathematician and astrologer to the emperor, that Kepler described the new star two years later in his De Stella Nova. In it, Kepler addressed the star's astronomical properties while taking a skeptical approach to the many astrological interpretations then circulating. He noted its fading luminosity, speculated about its origin, and used the lack of observed parallax to argue that it was beyond the planetary orbits, and thus in the sphere of fixed stars, further undermining the doctrine of the immutability of the heavens (the idea accepted since Aristotle that the celestial spheres were perfect and unchanging). The birth of a new star implied the variability of the heavens. Kepler also attached an appendix where he discussed the recent chronology work of the Polish historian Laurentius Suslyga; he calculated that, if Suslyga was correct that accepted timelines were four years behind, then the Star of Bethlehem—analogous to the present new star—would have coincided with the first great conjunction of the earlier 800-year cycle.

Over the following years, Kepler attempted (unsuccessfully) to begin a collaboration with Italian astronomer Giovanni Antonio Magini, and dealt with chronology, especially the dating of events in the life of Jesus. Around 1611, Kepler circulated a manuscript of what would eventually be published (posthumously) as Somnium [The Dream]. Part of the purpose of Somnium was to describe what practicing astronomy would be like from the perspective of another planet, to show the feasibility of a non-geocentric system. The manuscript, which disappeared after changing hands several times, described a fantastic trip to the Moon; it was part allegory, part autobiography, and part treatise on interplanetary travel (and is sometimes described as the first work of science fiction). Years later, a distorted version of the story may have instigated the witchcraft trial against his mother, as the mother of the narrator consults a demon to learn the means of space travel. Following her eventual acquittal, Kepler composed 223 footnotes to the story—several times longer than the actual text—which explained the allegorical aspects as well as the considerable scientific content (particularly regarding lunar geography) hidden within the text.

== Later life ==
=== Troubles ===
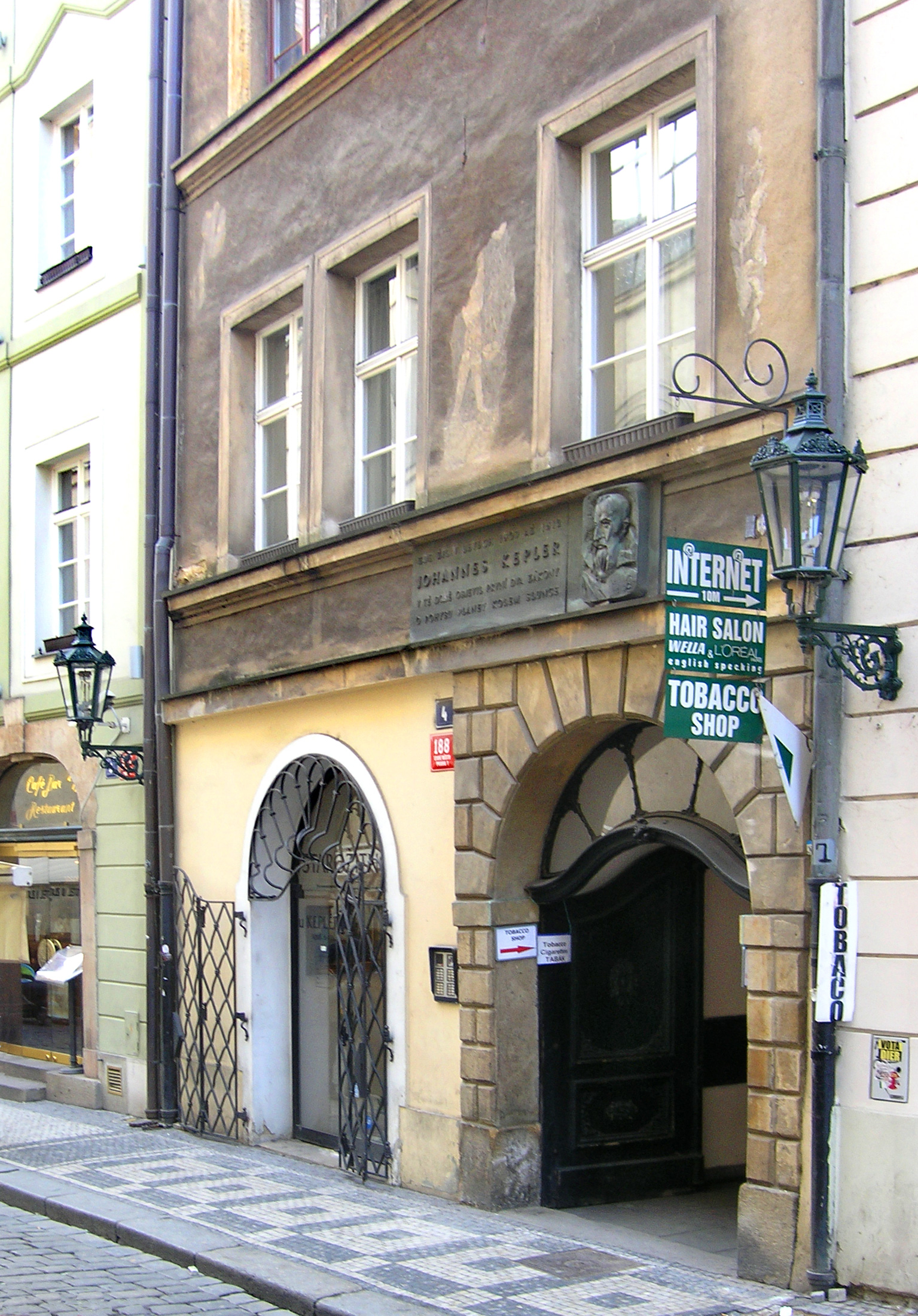
Karlova street in Old Town, Prague – the house where Kepler lived, now a museum

During Kepler's time in Prague, religious and political tensions were building up in the Empire, both between Protestants and Catholics, and within the Habsburg dynasty over the issue of succession. The situation in Prague, a cosmopolitan city, became increasingly difficult, and Kepler considered a move to Württemberg, which he considered his homeland. In 1609 he wrote to the Duke, Johann Frederick, requesting a position in the University of Tübingen. The Duke turned down the request, but sent a present as a token of goodwill. Kepler replied, and in his letter summarised his position on the doctrinal issues that had caused problems in the past. The Duke did not respond to this. Two years later, he tried again, but this time the request was referred to the theological consistory in Stuttgart, who rejected Kepler's request on 25 April 1611, denouncing his Calvinist leanings both in his reservations about the Formula of Concord, and his insistence that Calvinists should, despite disagreements, be considered "brothers in Christ".

In 1611, Emperor Rudolf's health was failing, and he was forced to abdicate as King of Bohemia by his brother Matthias. Both sides sought Kepler's astrological advice, an opportunity he used to deliver conciliatory political advice (with little reference to the stars, except in general statements to discourage drastic action). However, it was clear that Kepler's future prospects in the court of Matthias were bleak.

Also in that year, Kepler's wife Barbara contracted Hungarian spotted fever and began having seizures. While she was recovering, all three of their children fell sick with smallpox; six-year-old Friedrich died. As well as his approach to Württemberg, Kepler was in contact with Padua. The University of Padua — on the recommendation of the departing Galileo — sought Kepler to fill the mathematics professorship, but Kepler, preferring to keep his family in German territory, instead travelled to Austria to arrange a position as teacher and district mathematician in Linz. However, Barbara relapsed into illness and died shortly after Kepler's return.

Postponing the move to Linz, Kepler remained in Prague until Rudolf's death in early 1612, though political upheaval, religious tension, and family tragedy (along with the legal dispute over his wife's estate) prevented him from doing any research. Instead, he pieced together a chronology manuscript, Eclogae Chronicae, from correspondence and earlier work. Upon his succession as Holy Roman Emperor, Matthias re-affirmed Kepler's position (and salary) as imperial mathematician but allowed him to move to Linz.

=== Linz (1612–1626) ===
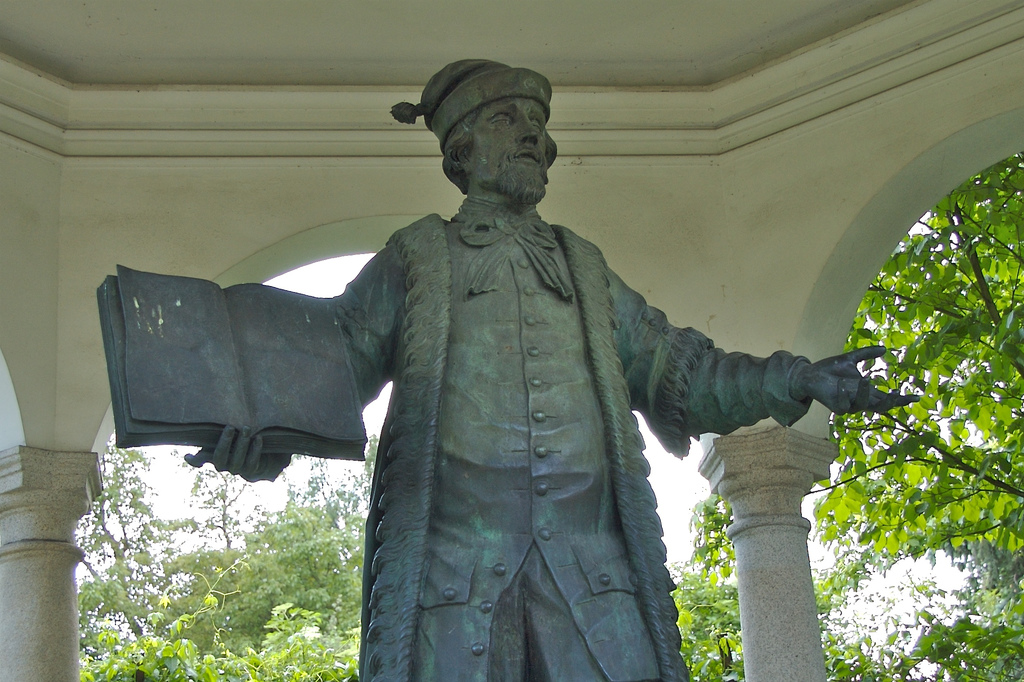
A statue of Kepler in Linz

In Linz, Kepler was appointed District Mathematician and teacher in the district school, as well as retaining his position as court mathematician to the Emperor. His first charge was completing the Rudolphine tables, but many other activities claimed his attention before these were completed. The tables were not published until 1627.

==== Excommunication ====
In Linz, Kepler's difficulties with Lutheran orthodoxy re-surfaced. The Counter-Reformation had not yet had a major impact on Upper Austria. While the ruler was Catholic, the majority of the population were Lutheran and were able to practice their faith. But the pastor of the Lutheran congregation, Daniel Hitzler, refused communion to Kepler on account of his unwillingness to fully endorse the Formula of Concord. The main issue was Kepler's views on the doctrine of ubiquity or Sacramental union, the belief in the real presence of Christ's body and blood in the Eucharist, which Kepler could not accept. Kepler appealed to the Stuttgart Consistory against his exclusion, and this led to a long correspondence. This involved various theologians including Matthias Hafenreffer. Hafenreffer had been a friend, but on this issue sided with the theological authorities. In 1619 his excommunication was finally and unequivocally declared.

==== Marriage to Susanna Reuttinger ====
In July 1612, Kepler met Matthias Bernegger, the humanist scholar and astronomer. Bernegger knew Kepler by reputation, and had sought him out. The two men became friends, and had extensive correspondence for nearly twenty years, although they never met again. Max Caspar described him as "the best and most faithful friend that he ever found". In an early letter to Bernegger, in October 1613, Kepler tells his friend of his forthcoming marriage, and announces the date as "the day of the eclipse of the moon, when the astronomical spirit is in hiding, as I want to rejoice in the festival day".

The day was 30 October 1613, and Kepler's second wife was Susanna Reuttinger from nearby Eferding. Following the death of his first wife Barbara, Kepler had considered 11 different matches over two years (a decision process formalized later as the marriage problem). He eventually returned to Reuttinger (the fifth match) who, he wrote, "won me over with love, humble loyalty, economy of household, diligence, and the love she gave the stepchildren". Kepler was now able to bring his children to Linz from Wels, where they had been staying with a relative. The first three children of his marriage to Susanna (Margareta Regina, Katharina, and Sebald) died in childhood. Three more survived into adulthood: Cordula (born 1621); Fridmar (born 1623); and Hildebert (born 1625). According to Kepler's biographers, this was a much happier marriage than his first.

==== Trial of Kepler's mother for witchcraft ====
In December 1615 Kepler received a letter from his family in Württemberg informing him that his mother Katharina, had been accused of witchcraft earlier that year. Katharina lived in the Protestant town of Leonberg. The initial accusation was made by Ursula Reinbold, who claimed that Katharina had given her a drink that made her ill. As the case became known, more rumours and accusations circulated, and Katharina's family raised an action for slander against the accusers. Kepler vowed to defend his mother, which he did both by despatches sent to the authorities in Leonberg, and by visiting in person. The case dragged in for several years, with Katharina held in prison from 1620-1621. The final stage was held in Tübingen, under the authority of the Duke, where it was determined that she should be questioned under the threat of torture. She refused to confess, saying she trusted to God to bring the truth to light. She was then absolved and discharged, being released on 4 October, 1621. She died about six months later. The process against Kepler's mother, starting soon after his initial excommunication, has been seen as part of an attack by the Lutheran authorities against Kepler himself.

==== Impact of war ====
Kepler had other difficulties at this time. In 1618 the conflict that would become the Thirty Years' War began with the Bohemian Revolt against Habsburg rule. Ferdinand II, who became Emperor in August 1619, secured the support of Maximilian I, Duke of Bavaria against the Bohemians. In July 1620, the Bavarian army entered Linz on the way to Bohemia. This posed a threat to the Protestants of Linz generally, as well as to Kepler, whose sympathies were with the Bohemians, now led by the Protestant Frederick, who had been declared King of Bohemia. Kepler had openly expressed his admiration for Fredericks's father-in-law, James VI and I King of England and Scotland, who he considered an important peacekeeper. He left Linz for Württemberg in September 1620 to defend his mother, taking his family with him as he did not know if he would be able to return. In November of that year the Bohemian forces were defeated at the Battle of White Mountain, and Frederick (the "Winter King") fled into exile. In November 1621, after his mother's release, Kepler did return to Linz. In December, Emperor Ferdinand confirmed him in his position as court mathematician. In 1622 Protestant preachers and schoolmasters were banished from Upper Austria, but Kepler was exempted as he was in Imperial service. He would remain in Linz for another four years, and complete the Rudolphine Tables.

==== Work ====
During his time in Linz, Kepler published a number of works. The first was a treatise on the year of the birth of Jesus. This was first published in German in 1613; an expanded Latin version was published the following year as De vero anno. In 1613 he was involved with another chronological issue when the Emperor summoned him to Regensburg to take part in deliberations on the calendar. The Gregorian calendar, the one in general use today, had been introduced by authority of Pope Gregory XIII in 1582, and adopted in much of Catholic Europe. The main changes from the Julian calendar which it superseded were to remove three leap years in every four centuries, to bring the calendar year in close alignment to the solar year, and to insert 10 days to correct the "drift" that had occurred since the Julian calendar was introduced, so that Thursday 4 October 1582 was followed by Friday 15 October 1582. The new calendar was denounced by Protestant authorities as at best an attempt to re-assert Papal authority in Protestant lands, and at worst as the work of the Devil. Kepler supported the new calendar on practical and astronomical grounds, but the reform was not accepted - it would be 1700 before the new calendar was adopted throughout Germany.

Kepler's next work was on measurement. Kepler, buying wine for his household in 1613, observed at first hand the standard method of determining the volume of a barrel, by inserting a measuring rod diagonally from the opening to the bottom of the cask. This led him to an analysis of the volumes of various shaped containers. Finding that no printer in Augsburg was willing to publish a book in Latin, he brought the printer Johannes Plank from Erfurt to Linz. Plank printed Nova stereometria doliorum vinariorum in 1615, the first book to be printed in Linz, at Kepler's own expense. A shortened German version was published the following year. Kepler's next work was his Epitome Astronomia Copernicae, a summary of Copernican theory, published in two volumes in 1618. In the following year, Kepler's work on Comets, De cometis libelli tres, was published in Augsburg. This book included much observational data and calculation, as well as astrological interpretation.

Also in 1619 Kepler's Harmonice Mundi was published. This work, aligning heavenly harmonies with musical ones, had a long gestation. Kepler had first drafted an outline in 1599. In 1618, his little daughter Katharina died, and the grieving father put aside the tables, which required peace, and turned to thinking about harmony. In that same year, he discovered what is now referred to as Kepler's Third Law, relating the orbital period of a planet to its distance from the sun. This finding was first stated in the Harmonice.

In 1617, while working on the Tables, Kepler first read Napier's work on logarithms, which had been published in 1614. He realised the value of the method for simplifying the many calculations required in the Tables, but was dissatisfied that Napier presented only the method and not the derivation. So he developed the idea from arithmetic principles, and derived his own tables from them. These tables had the advantage that they could be used directly on whole numbers and not just on trigonometric functions. This was published as Chilias logarithmorum ad totidem numeros rotundos in 1624. In the same year he completed work on the Rudolphine Tables. There were negotiations with the Brahe family before the work was ready for printing, and then issues with funding and a choice of printer. Kepler favoured Ulm, because the technical requirements of the work could be most readily met there, but the Emperor insisted it be printed in Austria, which in practice meant Linz, so Kepler set about obtaining suitable equipment, type, paper and workmen, travelling to Vienna and Nuremberg. But before work was fully underway, the city of Linz was besieged from June to August 1626 during the Peasant War. Kepler was unharmed, but the house and printing works, which were on the outskirts of the city, were destroyed by fire. As it was now impossible to complete printing in Linz, Kepler asked the Emperor for permission to move to Ulm. This was granted, and he left for Ulm in November, leaving his wife and family in Regensburg.

=== Ulm and Sagan 1626–1630 ===
Kepler had already identified a suitable printer in Ulm, his manuscript had not been damaged in the fire, and printing of the Tables soon got under way, and was completed in September 1627. Kepler was now looking for a stable position. The war had been going well for the Empire. The Peasant Uprising had been suppressed, and the Imperial commanders Wallenstein and Tilly had defeated Protestant forces including the Danish army under King Christian IV, who had come into the war on the Protestant side. Kepler travelled to Prague to present his Tables to the Emperor. He was nervous about his reception, as the rise in Catholic power might make his position difficult. But he received a warm welcome from the Emperor who was very interested in the Tables.

Wallenstein was also in Prague at this time, and had recently been granted the Dukedom of Sagan in Silesia. The two men had been in touch before, when Kepler provided a horoscope through an intermediary, and did not meet Wallenstein in person. Wallenstein negotiated with the Emperor, and invited Kepler to take up residence in Sagan. Kepler travelled to Linz to wind up his affairs there, then travelled with his family to Sagan, where he arrived on 20 July 1628. Kepler felt isolated in this North German city with its unfamiliar dialect. He wrote to Bernegger in March 1629:

It is loneliness whick makes me oppressed here, far away from the large cities, and letters come and go only slowly, and are causing great expense.

In December 1629, Kepler was able to establish a printing press, which published his Ephemerides for the years 1621–1639.

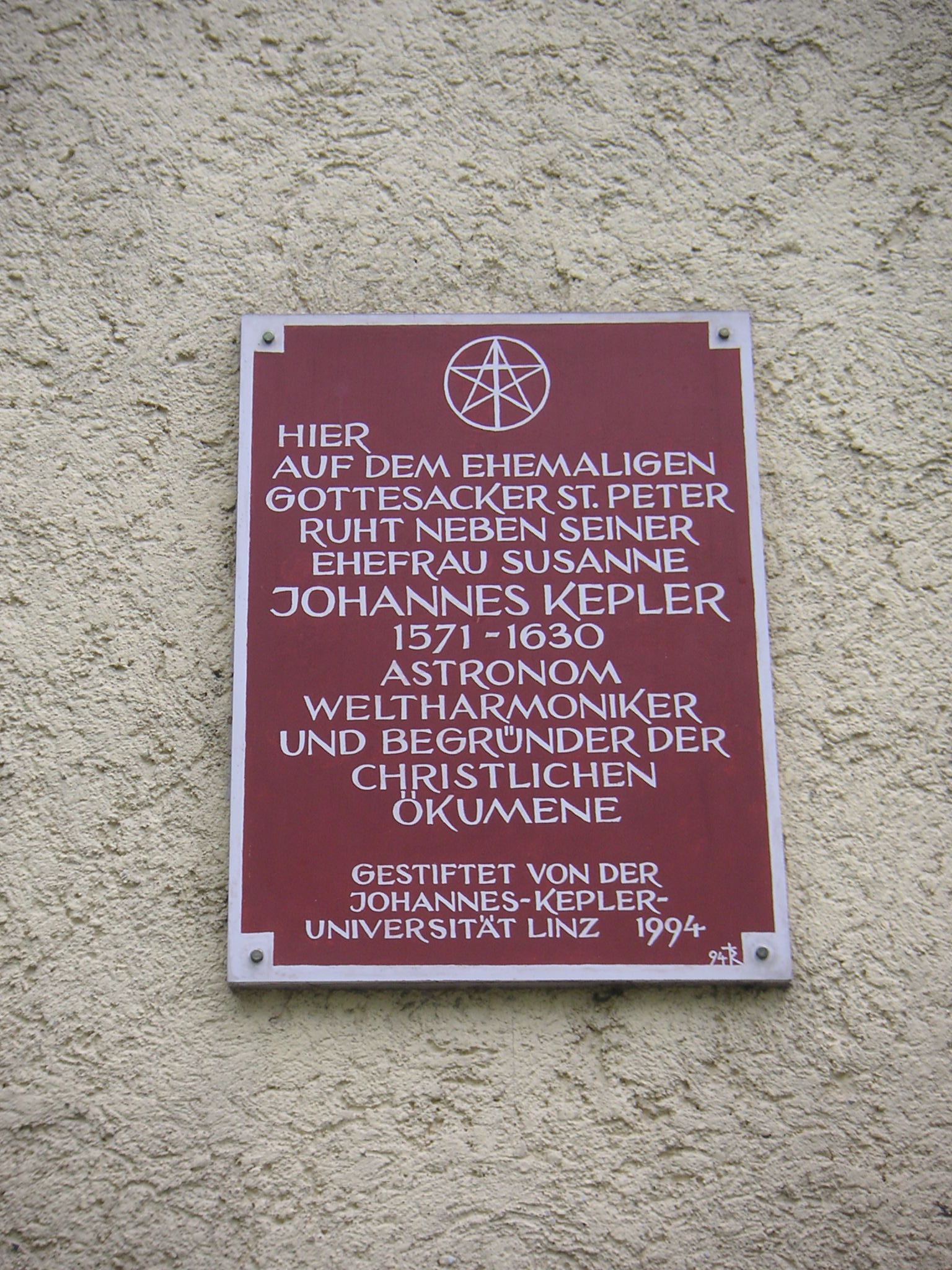
Regensburg, church Peterskirchlein, memorial plate for the tomb of Johannes Kepler

The move to Sagan had not solved Kepler's financial problems. He got little assistance from Wallenstein apart from his salary, and the Ephemerides were printed at his own expense. He was still owed considerable sums from the Imperial treasury for work he had done previously, so on 8 October 1630, he set out on a trip to Leipzig, Nuremberg, the Diet of Regensburg, and Linz, hoping to collect at least some of this. However, a few days after reaching Regensburg, he became sick and progressively worsened. Kepler died on 15 November 1630, just over a month after his arrival. He was buried just outside the Regensburg city walls in the Protestant cemetery of St. Peter, which was destroyed a few years later during the war.

=== Christianity ===
Kepler's belief that God created the cosmos in an orderly fashion caused him to attempt to determine and comprehend the laws that govern the natural world, most profoundly in astronomy. The phrase "I am merely thinking God's thoughts after Him" has been attributed to him, although this is probably a capsulized version of a writing from his hand:

Those laws [of nature] are within the grasp of the human mind; God wanted us to recognize them by creating us after his own image so that we could share in his own thoughts.

Kepler advocated for tolerance among Christian denominations, for example arguing that Catholics and Lutherans should be able to take communion together. He wrote, "Christ the Lord neither was nor is Lutheran, nor Calvinist, nor Papist."

== Astronomy ==
=== Mysterium Cosmographicum ===
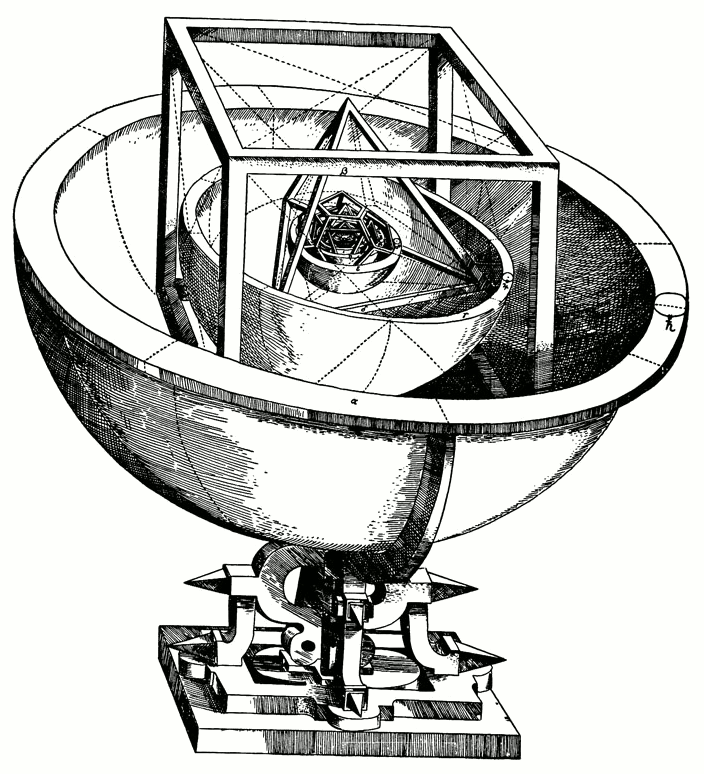
Kepler's Platonic solid model of the Solar System, from Mysterium Cosmographicum (1596)

Kepler's first major astronomical work was Mysterium Cosmographicum (The Cosmographic Mystery, 1596). Kepler claimed to have had an epiphany on 19 July 1595, while teaching in Graz, demonstrating the periodic conjunction of Saturn and Jupiter in the zodiac: he realized that regular polygons bound one inscribed and one circumscribed circle at definite ratios, which, he reasoned, might be the geometrical basis of the universe. After failing to find a unique arrangement of polygons that fit known astronomical observations (even with extra planets added to the system), Kepler began experimenting with 3-dimensional polyhedra. He found that each of the five Platonic solids could be inscribed and circumscribed by spherical orbs; nesting these solids, each encased in a sphere, within one another would produce six layers, corresponding to the six known planets—Mercury, Venus, Earth, Mars, Jupiter, and Saturn. By ordering the solids selectively—octahedron, icosahedron, dodecahedron, tetrahedron, cube—Kepler found that the spheres could be placed at intervals corresponding to the relative sizes of each planet's path, assuming the planets circle the Sun. Kepler also found a formula relating the size of each planet's orb to the length of its orbital period: from inner to outer planets, the ratio of increase in orbital period is twice the difference in orb radius.

Kepler thought the Mysterium had revealed God's geometrical plan for the universe. Much of Kepler's enthusiasm for the Copernican system stemmed from his theological convictions about the connection between the physical and the spiritual; the universe itself was an image of God, with the Sun corresponding to the Father, the stellar sphere to the Son, and the intervening space between them to the Holy Spirit. His first manuscript of Mysterium contained an extensive chapter reconciling heliocentrism with biblical passages that seemed to support geocentrism. With the support of his mentor Michael Maestlin, Kepler received permission from the Tübingen university senate to publish his manuscript, pending removal of the Bible exegesis and the addition of a simpler, more understandable, description of the Copernican system as well as Kepler's new ideas. Mysterium was published late in 1596, and Kepler received his copies and began sending them to prominent astronomers and patrons early in 1597; it was not widely read, but it established Kepler's reputation as a highly skilled astronomer. The effusive dedication, to powerful patrons as well as to the men who controlled his position in Graz, also provided a crucial doorway into the patronage system.

In 1621, Kepler published an expanded second edition of Mysterium, half as long again as the first, detailing in footnotes the corrections and improvements he had achieved in the 25 years since its first publication. In terms of impact, the Mysterium can be seen as an important first step in modernizing the theory proposed by Copernicus in his De revolutionibus orbium coelestium. While Copernicus sought to advance a heliocentric system in this book, he resorted to Ptolemaic devices (viz., epicycles and eccentric circles) in order to explain the change in planets' orbital speed, and also continued to use as a point of reference the center of the Earth's orbit rather than that of the Sun "as an aid to calculation and in order not to confuse the reader by diverging too much from Ptolemy." Modern astronomy owes much to Mysterium Cosmographicum, despite flaws in its main thesis, "since it represents the first step in cleansing the Copernican system of the remnants of the Ptolemaic theory still clinging to it." Kepler never abandoned his five solids theory, publishing the second edition of Mysterium in 1621 and affirming his continued belief in the validity of the model. Although he noted that there were discrepancies between the observational data and his model's predictions, he did not think they were large enough to invalidate the theory.

=== Astronomia Nova ===
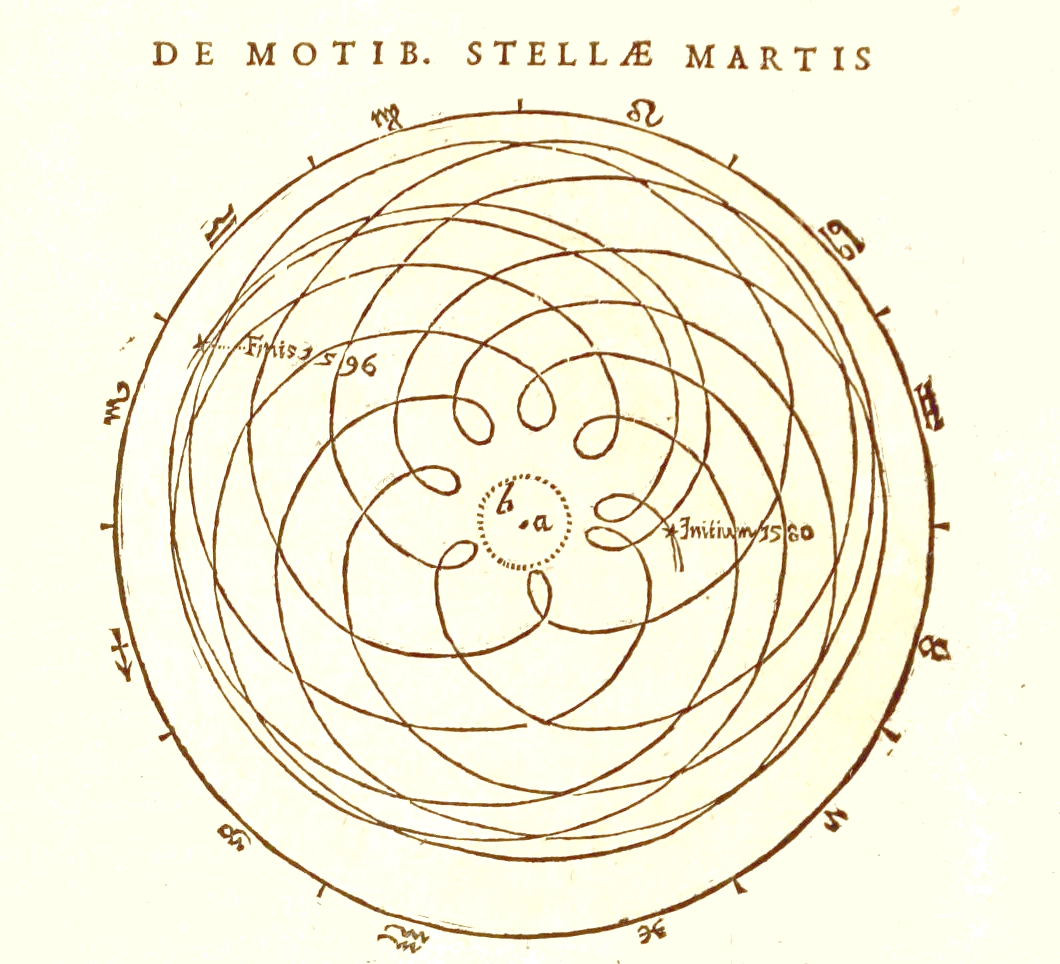
Diagram of the geocentric trajectory of Mars through several periods of apparent retrograde motion in Astronomia Nova (1609)

The extended line of research that culminated in Astronomia Nova (A New Astronomy)—including the first two laws of planetary motion—began with the analysis, under Tycho's direction, of the orbit of Mars. In this work Kepler introduced the revolutionary concept of planetary orbit, a path of a planet in space resulting from the action of physical causes, distinct from previously held notion of planetary orb (a spherical shell to which planet is attached). As a result of this breakthrough astronomical phenomena came to be seen as being governed by physical laws. Kepler calculated and recalculated various approximations of Mars's orbit using an equant (the mathematical tool that Copernicus had eliminated with his system), eventually creating a model that generally agreed with Tycho's observations to within two arcminutes (the average measurement error). But he was not satisfied with the complex and still slightly inaccurate result; at certain points the model differed from the data by up to eight arcminutes. The wide array of traditional mathematical astronomy methods having failed him, Kepler set about trying to fit an ovoid orbit to the data.

In Kepler's religious view of the cosmos, the Sun (a symbol of God the Father) was the source of motive force in the Solar System. As a physical basis, Kepler drew by analogy on William Gilbert's theory of the magnetic soul of the Earth from De Magnete (1600) and on his own work on optics. Kepler supposed that the motive power (or motive species) radiated by the Sun weakens with distance, causing faster or slower motion as planets move closer or farther from it. Using a physical model to derive a trajectory was a major breakthrough. Kepler did not simply assume a circular orbit but attempted to come up with its cause, and did this before discovering the area law. Perhaps this assumption entailed a mathematical relationship that would restore astronomical order. Based on measurements of the aphelion and perihelion of the Earth and Mars, he created a formula in which a planet's rate of motion is inversely proportional to its distance from the Sun. Verifying this relationship throughout the orbital cycle required very extensive calculation; to simplify this task, by late 1602 Kepler reformulated the proportion in terms of geometry: planets sweep out equal areas in equal times—his second law of planetary motion.

He then set about calculating the entire orbit of Mars, using the geometrical rate law and assuming an egg-shaped ovoid orbit. After approximately 40 failed attempts, in late 1604 he at last hit upon the idea of an ellipse, which he had previously assumed to be too simple a solution for earlier astronomers to have overlooked. Finding that an elliptical orbit fit the Mars data (the Vicarious Hypothesis), Kepler immediately concluded that all planets move in ellipses, with the Sun at one focus—his first law of planetary motion. Because he employed no calculating assistants, he did not extend the mathematical analysis beyond Mars. By the end of the year, he completed the manuscript for Astronomia nova, though it would not be published until 1609 due to legal disputes over the use of Tycho's observations, the property of his heirs.

=== Epitome of Copernican Astronomy ===
Since completing the Astronomia Nova, Kepler had intended to compose an astronomy textbook that would cover all the fundamentals of heliocentric astronomy. Kepler spent the next several years working on what would become Epitome Astronomiae Copernicanae (Epitome of Copernican Astronomy). Despite its title, which merely hints at heliocentrism, the Epitome is less about Copernicus's work and more about Kepler's own astronomical system. The Epitome contained all three laws of planetary motion and attempted to explain heavenly motions through physical causes. Although it explicitly extended the first two laws of planetary motion (applied to Mars in Astronomia nova) to all the planets as well as the Moon and the Medicean satellites of Jupiter, it did not explain how elliptical orbits could be derived from observational data.

Originally intended as an introduction for the uninitiated, Kepler sought to model his Epitome after that of his master Michael Maestlin, who published a well-regarded book explaining the basics of geocentric astronomy to non-experts. Kepler completed the first of three volumes, consisting of Books I–III, by 1615 in the same question-answer format of Maestlin's and have it printed in 1617. However, the banning of Copernican books by the Catholic Church, as well as the start of the Thirty Years' War, meant that publication of the next two volumes would be delayed. In the interim, and to avoid being subject to the ban, Kepler switched the audience of the Epitome from beginners to that of expert astronomers and mathematicians, as the arguments became more and more sophisticated and required advanced mathematics to be understood. The second volume, consisting of Book IV, was published in 1620, followed by the third volume, consisting of Books V–VII, in 1621.

=== Rudolphine Tables ===
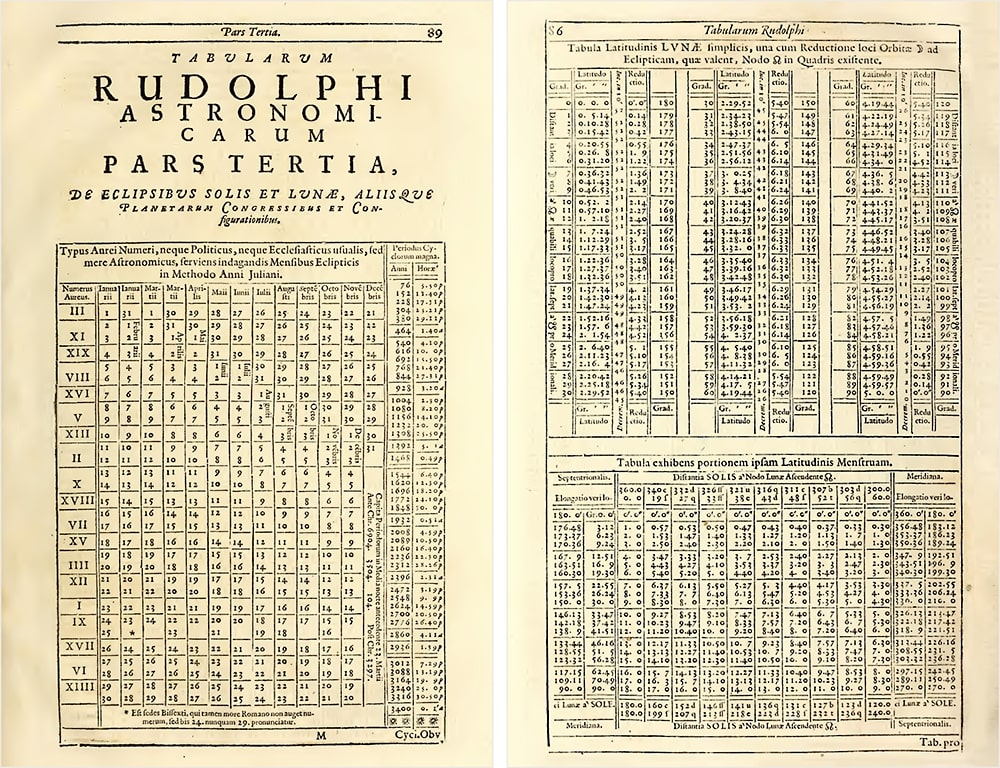
Two pages from Kepler's Rudolphine Tables showing eclipses of the Sun and Moon

In the years following the completion of Astronomia Nova, most of Kepler's research was focused on preparations for the Rudolphine Tables and a comprehensive set of ephemerides (specific predictions of planet and star positions) based on the table, though neither would be completed for many years.

Kepler, at last, completed the Rudolphine Tables in 1623, which at the time was considered his major work. However, due to the publishing requirements of the emperor and negotiations with Tycho Brahe's heir, it would not be printed until 1627.

== Tides and gravity ==
Kepler's writings about the tides are found in a number of his works. In Thesis 15 of De fundamentis Astrologiae Certioribus (On the More Certain Fundamentals of Astrology, 1601) he states "For it has been proved by experience that all things uniformly moist swell with the waxing Moon and subside with the waning moon", and later in Thesis 47 links a 19-year cycle of the tides with a similar cycle of the Moon.. This is thought to be the first reference to a 19-year tide-cycle. In his notes to Somnium (Dream, a novel written in 1608, but not published until 1634) he speculates that tides are due to the attraction of the waters of the Earth by the Moon, by a force similar to magnetism. He developed his ideas on gravity and the tides further in Astronomia Nova (New Astronomy, 1609) which lists a series of axioms. Gravity is defined as "A mutual corporeal attraction among cognate bodies." Heavy bodies are not attracted to the centre of the universe, as in classical astronomy, but to the centre of a round cognate body such as the Earth. He is clear that the attraction is mutual, and that the attractive forces exercised by two bodies such as the Earth and the Moon on each other are proportional to their respective masses. He links the gravitational attraction to the tides, stating that "if the Earth should cease to attract its waters, all marine waters would be elevated and would flow into the body of the moon".

Edward Rosen discusses the place of Kepler's concept of gravity in the early modern period leading up to Newton's law of universal gravitation in an appendix to his translation of Somnium. Before Copernicus, the main conception of gravity was that of Aristotle, who held that heavy bodies moved towards the centre of the universe. As the Earth was assumed to be fixed with its centre at the centre of the universe, they would fall towards the centre of the Earth. Copernicus broke this connection when he placed the Sun at the centre with the Earth rotating about it. For Copernicus gravity was a "certain natural desire with which parts have been endowed", present in the Sun, Moon, and planets, which led to them keeping their spherical shape, but as Rosen points out these bodies did not attract each other. Kepler extended the concept further, generalising it to attraction between cognate bodies, which included the Sun, Moon, and planets, as well as stones. But he did not use this concept to account for the orbital motions of the planets, which Kepler believed to be due to rotating force emanating from the Sun. Moreover he did not extend the idea of mutual attraction to the stars beyond the planetary orbits. Thus his was not a theory of universal gravitation, which would have to wait until Newton.

Galileo Galilei rejected Kepler's concept of gravity because he regarded what we now refer to as action at a distance as a form of mysticism. Galileo had his own theory which he regarded as an important proof that the Earth moves, and indeed claimed that tides were the only observable phenomenon that could not be explained using a Ptolemaic Earth-centred model. In comparing his theory to the work of others, Galileo singled out Kepler for scorn: "I am more astonished at Kepler than at any other. Despite his open and acute mind, and though he has at his fingertips the motions attributed to the Earth, he has nevertheless lent his ear and his assent to the moon's dominion over the waters, to occult properties, and to such puerilities." Kepler pointed out that Galileo's theory had no adequate way to account for the association of tide time with the phases of the Moon, a relation that had been known since antiquity and repeatedly confirmed.

== Astrology ==
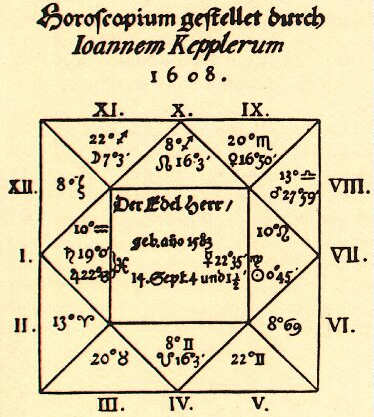
Kepler's horoscope for General Wallenstein

Like Ptolemy, Kepler considered astrology as the counterpart to astronomy, and as being of equal interest and value. However, in the following years, the two subjects drifted apart until astrology was no longer practiced among professional astronomers.

Sir Oliver Lodge observed that Kepler was somewhat disdainful of astrology in his own day, as he was "continually attacking and throwing sarcasm at astrology, but it was the only thing for which people would pay him, and on it after a fashion he lived. Nonetheless, Kepler spent a huge amount of time trying to restore astrology on a firmer philosophical footing, composing numerous astrological calendars, more than 800 nativities, and a number of treatises dealing with the subject of astrology proper.

=== De Fundamentis ===
In his bid to become imperial astronomer, Kepler wrote De Fundamentis (1601), whose full title can be translated as "On Giving Astrology Sounder Foundations", as a short foreword to one of his yearly almanacs.

In this work, Kepler describes the effects of the Sun, Moon, and the planets in terms of their light and their influences upon humors, concluding with Kepler's view that the Earth possesses a soul with some sense of geometry. Stimulated by the geometric convergence of rays formed around it, the world-soul is sentient but not conscious. As a shepherd is pleased by the piping of a flute without understanding the theory of musical harmony, so likewise Earth responds to the angles and aspects made by the heavens but not in a conscious manner. Eclipses are important as omens because the animal faculty of the Earth is violently disturbed by the sudden intermission of light, experiencing something like emotion and persisting in it for some time.

Kepler surmises that the Earth has "cycles of humors" as living animals do, and provides as an example: "the highest tides of the sea are said by sailors to return after nineteen years around the same days of the year". (This may refer to the 18.6-year lunar node precession cycle.) Kepler advocates searching for such cycles by gathering observations over a period of many years, "and so far this observation has not been made".

=== Tertius Interveniens ===
Kepler and Helisaeus Roeslin engaged in a series of published attacks and counter-attacks on the importance of astrology after the supernova of 1604; around the same time, physician Philip Feselius published a work dismissing astrology altogether (and Roeslin's work in particular).

In response to what Kepler saw as the excesses of astrology, on the one hand, and overzealous rejection of it, on the other, Kepler prepared Tertius Interveniens (1610). Nominally this work—presented to the common patron of Roeslin and Feselius—was a neutral mediation between the feuding scholars (the titled meaning "Third-party interventions"), but it also set out Kepler's general views on the value of astrology, including some hypothesized mechanisms of interaction between planets and individual souls. While Kepler considered most traditional rules and methods of astrology to be the "evil-smelling dung" in which "an industrious hen" scrapes, there was an "occasional grain-seed, indeed, even a pearl or a gold nugget" to be found by the conscientious scientific astrologer.

== Music ==
=== Harmonice Mundi ===
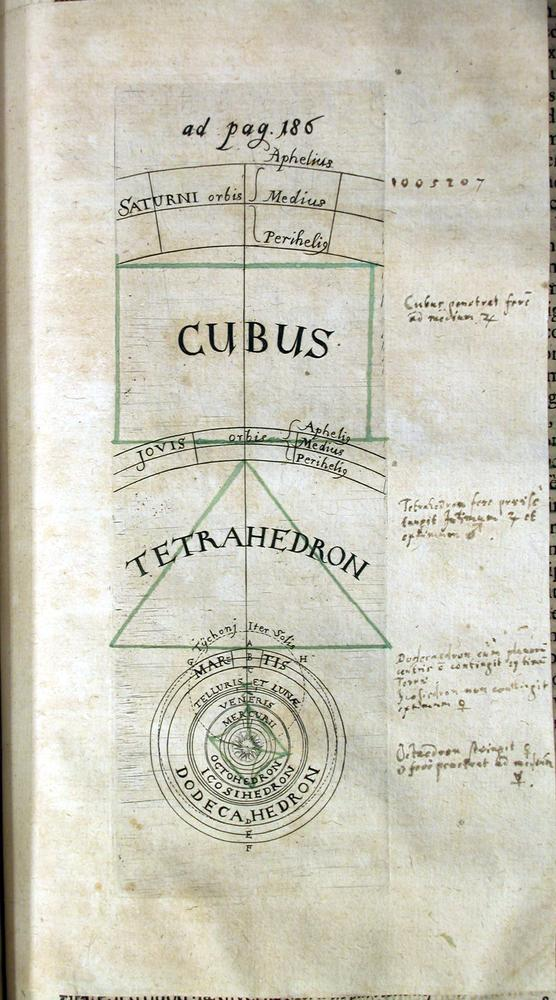
Geometrical harmonies from Harmonice Mundi (1619)

Kepler was convinced "that the geometrical things have provided the Creator with the model for decorating the whole world". In Harmonice Mundi (1619), he attempted to explain the proportions of the natural world—particularly the astronomical and astrological aspects—in terms of music. (Note: The opening of the movie Mars et Avril by Martin Villeneuve is based on German astronomer Johannes Kepler's cosmological model from the 17th century, Harmonice Mundi, in which the harmony of the universe is determined by the motion of celestial bodies. Benoît Charest also composed the score according to this theory.) The central set of "harmonies" was the musica universalis or "music of the spheres", which had been studied by Pythagoras, Ptolemy and others before Kepler; in fact, soon after publishing Harmonice Mundi, Kepler was embroiled in a priority dispute with Robert Fludd, who had recently published his own harmonic theory.

Kepler began by exploring regular polygons and regular solids, including the figures that would come to be known as Kepler's solids. From there, he extended his harmonic analysis to music, meteorology, and astrology; harmony resulted from the tones made by the souls of heavenly bodies—and in the case of astrology, the interaction between those tones and human souls. In the final portion of the work (Book V), Kepler dealt with planetary motions, especially relationships between orbital velocity and orbital distance from the Sun. Similar relationships had been used by other astronomers, but Kepler—with Tycho's data and his own astronomical theories—treated them much more precisely and attached new physical significance to them.

Among many other harmonies, Kepler articulated what came to be known as the third law of planetary motion. He tried many combinations until he discovered that (approximately) "The square of the periodic times are to each other as the cubes of the mean distances." Although he gives the date of this epiphany (8 March 1618), he does not give any details about how he arrived at this conclusion. However, the wider significance for planetary dynamics of this purely kinematical law was not realized until the 1660s. When conjoined with Christiaan Huygens' newly discovered law of centrifugal force, it enabled Isaac Newton, Edmund Halley, and perhaps Christopher Wren and Robert Hooke to demonstrate independently that the presumed gravitational attraction between the Sun and its planets decreased with the square of the distance between them. This refuted the traditional assumption of scholastic physics that the power of gravitational attraction remained constant with distance whenever it applied between two bodies, such as was assumed by Kepler and also by Galileo in his mistaken universal law that gravitational fall is uniformly accelerated, and also by Galileo's student Borrelli in his 1666 celestial mechanics.

== Optics ==
=== Astronomiae Pars Optica ===
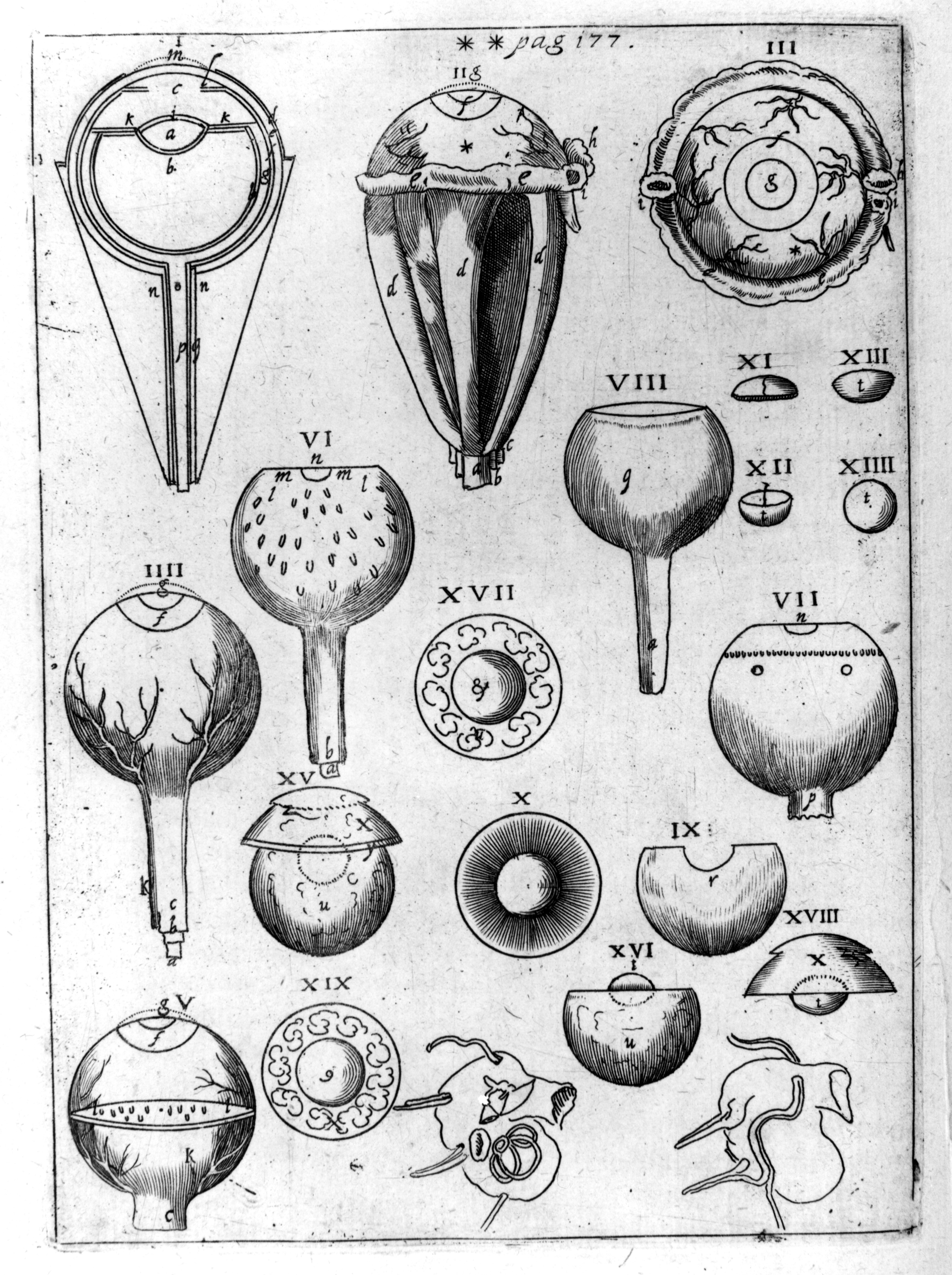
A plate from Astronomiae Pars Optica, illustrating the structure of eyes of various species

As Kepler slowly continued analyzing Tycho's Mars observations—now available to him in their entirety—and began the slow process of tabulating the Rudolphine Tables, Kepler also picked up the investigation of the laws of optics from his lunar essay of 1600. Both lunar and solar eclipses presented unexplained phenomena, such as unexpected shadow sizes, the red color of a total lunar eclipse, and the reportedly unusual light surrounding a total solar eclipse. Related issues of atmospheric refraction applied to all astronomical observations. Through most of 1603, Kepler paused his other work to focus on optical theory; the resulting manuscript, presented to the emperor on 1 January 1604, was published as Astronomiae Pars Optica (The Optical Part of Astronomy). In it, Kepler described the inverse-square law governing the intensity of light, reflection by flat and curved mirrors, and principles of pinhole cameras, as well as the astronomical implications of optics such as parallax and the apparent sizes of heavenly bodies. He also extended his study of optics to the human eye, and is generally considered by neuroscientists to be the first to recognize that images are projected inverted and reversed by the eye's lens onto the retina. The solution to this dilemma was not of particular importance to Kepler as he did not see it as pertaining to optics, although he did suggest that the image was later corrected "in the hollows of the brain" due to the "activity of the Soul."

Today, Astronomiae Pars Optica is generally recognized as the foundation of modern optics (though the law of refraction is conspicuously absent). With respect to the beginnings of projective geometry, Kepler introduced the idea of continuous change of a mathematical entity in this work. He argued that if a focus of a conic section were allowed to move along the line joining the foci, the geometric form would morph or degenerate, one into another. In this way, an ellipse becomes a parabola when a focus moves toward infinity, and when two foci of an ellipse merge into one another, a circle is formed. As the foci of a hyperbola merge into one another, the hyperbola becomes a pair of straight lines. He also assumed that if a straight line is extended to infinity it will meet itself at a single point at infinity, thus having the properties of a large circle.

=== Dioptrice ===
In the first months of 1610, Galileo Galilei—using his powerful new telescope—discovered four satellites orbiting Jupiter. Upon publishing his account as Sidereus Nuncius [Starry Messenger], Galileo sought the opinion of Kepler, in part to bolster the credibility of his observations. Kepler responded enthusiastically with a short published reply, Dissertatio cum Nuncio Sidereo [Conversation with the Starry Messenger]. He endorsed Galileo's observations and offered a range of speculations about the meaning and implications of Galileo's discoveries and telescopic methods, for astronomy and optics as well as cosmology and astrology. Later that year, Kepler published his own telescopic observations of the moons in Narratio de Jovis Satellitibus, providing further support of Galileo. To Kepler's disappointment, however, Galileo never published his reactions (if any) to Astronomia Nova.

Kepler also started a theoretical and experimental investigation of telescopic lenses using a telescope borrowed from Duke Ernest of Cologne. The resulting manuscript was completed in September 1610 and published as Dioptrice in 1611. In it, Kepler set out the theoretical basis of double-convex converging lenses and double-concave diverging lenses—and how they are combined to produce a Galilean telescope—as well as the concepts of real vs. virtual images, upright vs. inverted images, and the effects of focal length on magnification and reduction. He also described an improved telescope—now known as the astronomical or Keplerian telescope—in which two convex lenses can produce higher magnification than Galileo's combination of convex and concave lenses.

== Mathematics and physics ==
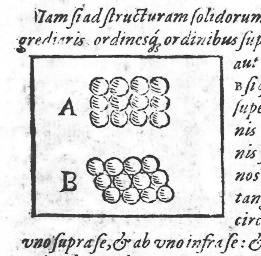
A diagram illustrating the Kepler conjecture from Strena Seu de Nive Sexangula (1611)

As a New Year's gift that year (1611), he also composed for his friend and some-time patron, Baron Wackher von Wackhenfels, a short pamphlet entitled Strena Seu de Nive Sexangula (A New Year's Gift of Hexagonal Snow). In this treatise, he published the first description of the hexagonal symmetry of snowflakes and, extending the discussion into a hypothetical atomistic physical basis for their symmetry, posed what later became known as the Kepler conjecture, a statement about the most efficient arrangement for packing spheres. This important mathematical problem has practical applications in the understanding of crystalline solids; it was formally solved by Thomas Hales in 2017.

Kepler wrote the influential mathematical treatise Nova stereometria doliorum vinariorum in 1613, on measuring the volume of containers such as wine barrels, which was published in 1615. Kepler also contributed to the development of infinitesimal methods and numerical analysis, including iterative approximations, infinitesimals, and the early use of logarithms and transcendental equations. Kepler's work on calculating volumes of shapes, and on finding the optimal shape of a wine barrel, were significant steps toward the development of calculus. Simpson's rule, an approximation method used in integral calculus, is known in German as Keplersche Fassregel (Kepler's barrel rule).

== Legacy ==
=== Reception of his astronomy ===
Kepler's laws of planetary motion were not immediately accepted. Several major figures such as Galileo and René Descartes completely ignored Kepler's Astronomia nova. Many astronomers, including Kepler's teacher, Michael Maestlin, objected to Kepler's introduction of physics into his astronomy. Some adopted compromise positions. Ismaël Bullialdus accepted elliptical orbits but replaced Kepler's area law with uniform motion in respect to the empty focus of the ellipse, while Seth Ward used an elliptical orbit with motions defined by an equant.

Several astronomers tested Kepler's theory, and its various modifications, against astronomical observations. Two transits of Venus and Mercury across the face of the Sun provided sensitive tests of the theory, under circumstances when these planets could not normally be observed. In the case of the transit of Mercury in 1631, Kepler had been extremely uncertain of the parameters for Mercury, and advised observers to look for the transit the day before and after the predicted date. Pierre Gassendi observed the transit on the date predicted, a confirmation of Kepler's prediction. This was the first observation of a transit of Mercury. However, his attempt to observe the transit of Venus just one month later was unsuccessful due to inaccuracies in the Rudolphine Tables. Gassendi did not realize that it was not visible from most of Europe, including Paris. Jeremiah Horrocks, who observed the 1639 Venus transit, had used his own observations to adjust the parameters of the Keplerian model, predicted the transit, and then built apparatus to observe the transit. He remained a firm advocate of the Keplerian model.

Epitome of Copernican Astronomy was read by astronomers throughout Europe, and following Kepler's death, it was the main vehicle for spreading Kepler's ideas. In the period 1630–1650, this book was the most widely used astronomy textbook, winning many converts to ellipse-based astronomy. However, few adopted his ideas on the physical basis for celestial motions. In the late 17th century, a number of physical astronomy theories drawing from Kepler's work—notably those of Giovanni Alfonso Borelli and Robert Hooke—began to incorporate attractive forces (though not the quasi-spiritual motive species postulated by Kepler) and the Cartesian concept of inertia. In Principia Mathematica (1687), Isaac Newton derived Kepler's laws of planetary motion from a force-based theory of universal gravitation, a mathematical challenge later known as "solving the Kepler problem".

=== History of science ===
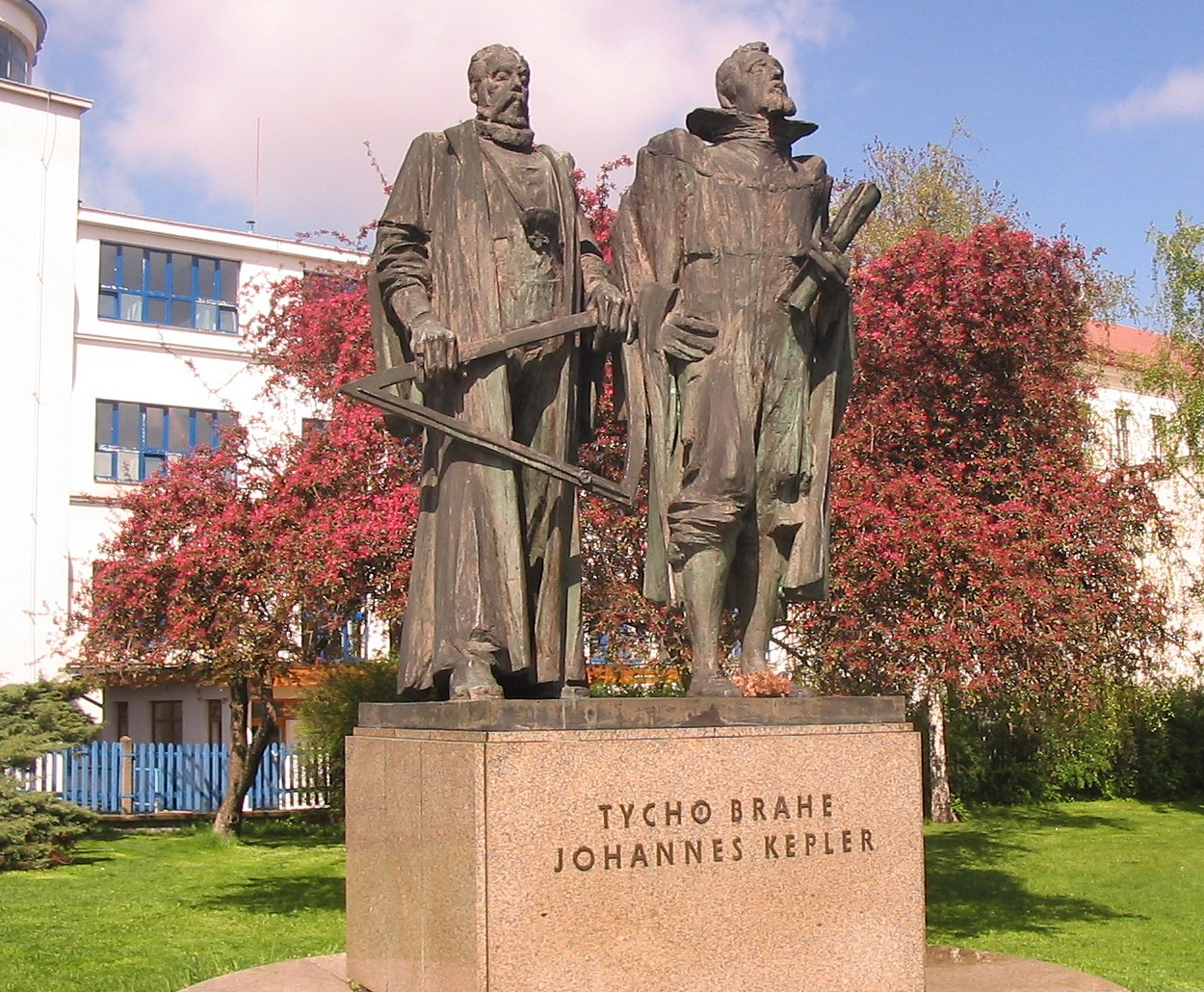
Monument to Tycho Brahe and Kepler in Prague, Czech Republic

Beyond his role in the historical development of astronomy and natural philosophy, Kepler has loomed large in the philosophy and historiography of science. Kepler and his laws of motion were central to early histories of astronomy such as Jean-Étienne Montucla's 1758 Histoire des mathématiques and Jean-Baptiste Delambre's 1821 Histoire de l'astronomie moderne. These and other histories written from an Enlightenment perspective treated Kepler's metaphysical and religious arguments with skepticism and disapproval, but later Romantic-era natural philosophers viewed these elements as central to his success. William Whewell, in his influential History of the Inductive Sciences of 1837, found Kepler to be the archetype of the inductive scientific genius; in his Philosophy of the Inductive Sciences of 1840, Whewell held Kepler up as the embodiment of the most advanced forms of scientific method. Similarly, Ernst Friedrich Apelt—the first to extensively study Kepler's manuscripts, after their purchase by Catherine the Great—identified Kepler as a key to the "Revolution of the sciences". Apelt, who saw Kepler's mathematics, aesthetic sensibility, physical ideas, and theology as part of a unified system of thought, produced the first extended analysis of Kepler's life and work.

Alexandre Koyré's work on Kepler was, after Apelt, the first major milestone in historical interpretations of Kepler's cosmology and its influence. In the 1930s and 1940s, Koyré, and a number of others in the first generation of professional historians of science, described the "Scientific Revolution" as the central event in the history of science, and Kepler as a (perhaps the) central figure in the revolution. Koyré placed Kepler's theorization, rather than his empirical work, at the center of the intellectual transformation from ancient to modern worldviews. Since the 1960s, the volume of historical Kepler scholarship has expanded greatly, including studies of his astrology and meteorology, his geometrical methods, the role of his religious views in his work, his literary and rhetorical methods, his interaction with the broader cultural and philosophical currents of his time, and even his role as an historian of science.

Philosophers of science—such as Charles Sanders Peirce, Norwood Russell Hanson, Stephen Toulmin, and Karl Popper—have repeatedly turned to Kepler: examples of incommensurability, analogical reasoning, falsification, and many other philosophical concepts have been found in Kepler's work. Physicist Wolfgang Pauli even used Kepler's priority dispute with Robert Fludd to explore the implications of analytical psychology on scientific investigation.

=== Editions and translations ===
Modern translations of a number of Kepler's books appeared in the late nineteenth and early twentieth centuries, the systematic publication of his collected works began in 1937 (and is nearing completion in the early 21st century).

An edition in eight volumes, Kepleri Opera omnia, was prepared by Christian Frisch (1807–1881), during 1858 to 1871, on the occasion of Kepler's 300th birthday. Frisch's edition only included Kepler's Latin, with a Latin commentary.

A new edition was planned beginning in 1914 by Walther von Dyck (1856–1934). Dyck compiled copies of Kepler's unedited manuscripts, using international diplomatic contacts to convince the Soviet authorities to lend him the manuscripts kept in Leningrad for photographic reproduction. These manuscripts contained several works by Kepler that had not been available to Frisch. Dyck's photographs remain the basis for the modern editions of Kepler's unpublished manuscripts.

Max Caspar (1880–1956) published his German translation of Kepler's Mysterium Cosmographicum in 1923. Both Dyck and Caspar were influenced in their interest in Kepler by mathematician Alexander von Brill (1842–1935). Caspar became Dyck's collaborator, succeeding him as project leader in 1934, establishing the Kepler-Kommission in the following year. Assisted by Martha List (1908–1992) and Franz Hammer (1898–1969), Caspar continued editorial work during World War II. Max Caspar also published a biography of Kepler in 1948. The commission was later chaired by Volker Bialas (during 1976–2003) and Ulrich Grigull (during 1984–1999) and Roland Bulirsch (1998–2014).

=== Cultural influence and eponymy ===
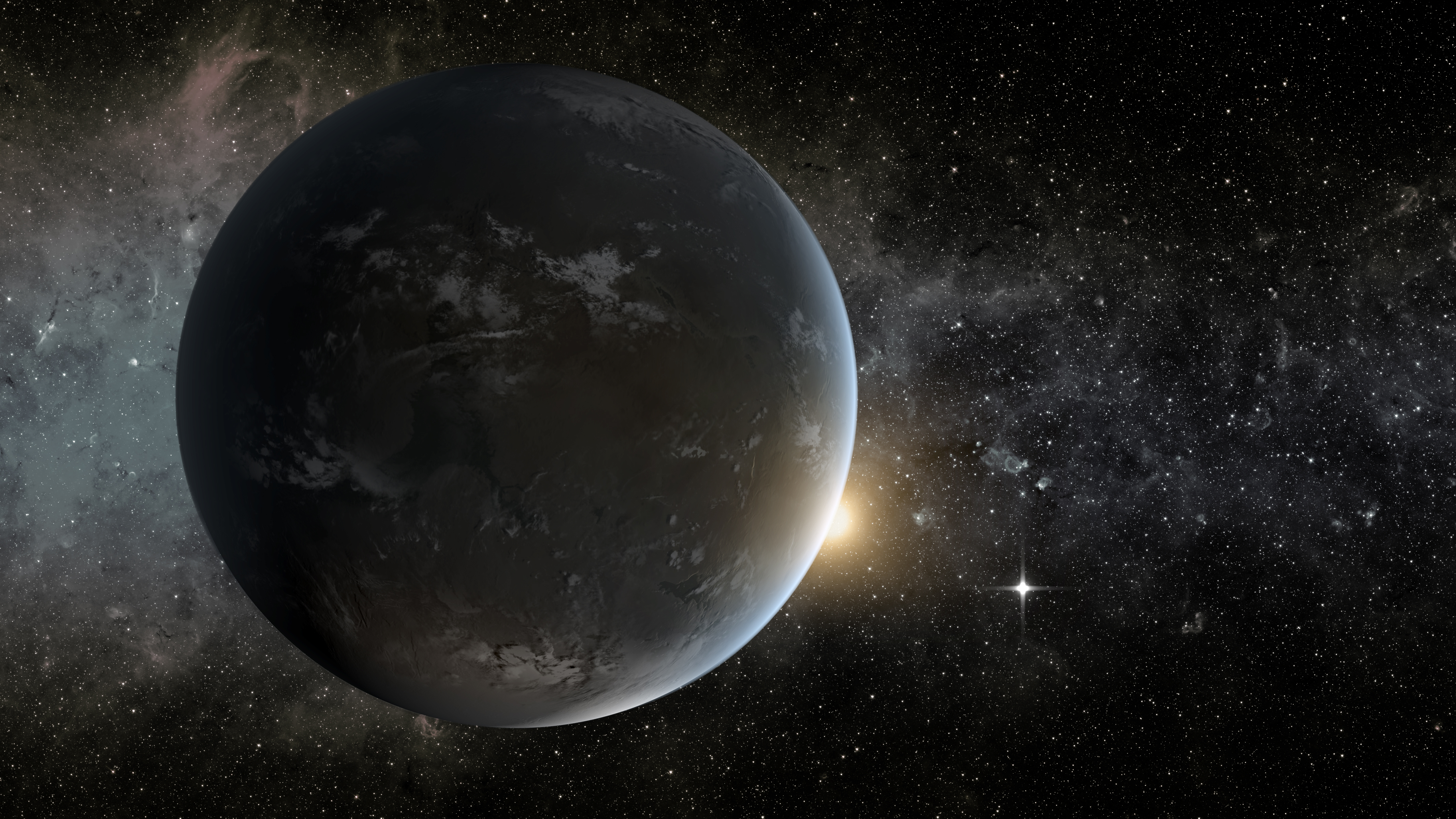
An artist's rendition of Kepler-62f, a potentially habitable exoplanet discovered using data transmitted by the Kepler space telescope

Kepler has acquired a popular image as an icon of scientific modernity and a man before his time; science popularizer Carl Sagan described him as "the first astrophysicist and the last scientific astrologer". The debate over Kepler's place in the Scientific Revolution has produced a wide variety of philosophical and popular treatments. One of the most influential is Arthur Koestler's 1959 book, The Sleepwalkers: A History of Man's Changing Vision of the Universe, in which Kepler is unambiguously the hero (morally and theologically, as well as intellectually) of the revolution.

John Banville's well-received historical novel Kepler (1981) explored many of the themes developed in Koestler's non-fiction narrative and in the philosophy of science. A 2004 nonfiction book, Heavenly Intrigue, speculated that Kepler murdered Tycho Brahe to gain access to his data. In 2010, Tycho Brahe was exhumed by a Dutch–Czech team, and his bones, teeth and beard where analyzed for mercury. The results conclusively eliminate mercury poisoning as a cause of Brahe's death.

In Austria, a silver collector's 10-euro Johannes Kepler silver coin was minted in 2002. The reverse side of the coin has a portrait of Kepler, who spent some time teaching in Graz and the surrounding areas. Kepler was acquainted with Prince Hans Ulrich von Eggenberg personally, and he probably influenced the construction of Eggenberg Castle (the motif of the obverse of the coin). In front of him on the coin is the model of nested spheres and polyhedra from Mysterium Cosmographicum.

The German composer Paul Hindemith wrote an opera about Kepler titled Die Harmonie der Welt (1957), and during the prolonged process of its creation he concurrently wrote a symphony of the same name based on the musical ideas he had developed for the opera. Hindemith's work inspired John Rodgers and Willie Ruff of Yale University to create a synthesizer composition based on Kepler's scheme for representing planetary motion with music. Philip Glass wrote an opera called Kepler (2009) based on Kepler's life, with a libretto in German and Latin by Martina Winkel.

Directly named for Kepler's contribution to science are: Kepler's laws of planetary motion; Kepler's Supernova SN 1604, which he observed and described; the Kepler–Poinsot polyhedra (a set of geometrical constructions), two of which were described by him; and the Kepler conjecture on sphere packing. Places and entities named in his honor include multiple city streets and squares, several educational institutions, an asteroid, a lunar crater, and a Martian crater.

The Kepler space telescope has observed 530,506 stars and detected 2,778 confirmed planets (as of 16 June 2023), many of them named after the telescope and Kepler himself.

== Works ==
- Mysterium Cosmographicum (The Sacred Mystery of the Cosmos) (1596)
- De Fundamentis Astrologiae Certioribus (On Firmer Fundaments of Astrology) (1601)
- Astronomiae pars optica (in Latin). Frankfurt am Main: Claude de Marne. 1604.
- De Stella nova in pede Serpentarii (On the New Star in Ophiuchus's Foot) (1606)
- Astronomia nova (New Astronomy) (1609)
- Tertius Interveniens (Third-party Interventions) (1610)
- Dissertatio cum Nuncio Sidereo (Conversation with the Starry Messenger) (1610)
- Dioptrice (1611)
- De nive sexangula (On the Six-Cornered Snowflake) (1611)
- De vero Anno, quo aeternus Dei Filius humanam naturam in Utero benedictae Virginis Mariae assumpsit (1614)
- Eclogae Chronicae (1615, published with Dissertatio cum Nuncio Sidereo)
- Nova stereometria doliorum vinariorum (New Stereometry of Wine Barrels) (1615)
- Ephemerides nouae motuum coelestium (1617–30)
- Epitome astronomiae copernicanae (in Latin). Linz: Johann Planck. 1618.
- Epitome astronomiae Copernicanae. 1–3, De doctrina sphaerica (in Latin). Vol. 44199. Linz: Johann Planck. 1618.
  - Epitome astronomiae Copernicanae. 4, Doctrina theorica. 1, Physica coelestis (in Latin). Vol. 4. Linz: Gottfried Tambach. 1622.
  - Epitome astronomiae Copernicanae. 5–7, Doctrina theorica (in Latin). Vol. 44323. Linz: Gottfried Tambach. 1621.
- De cometis (in Latin). Augsburg: Sebastian Müller. 1619.
- Harmonice Mundi (Harmony of the Worlds) (1619)
- Mysterium cosmographicum (The Sacred Mystery of the Cosmos), 2nd edition (1621)
- Tabulae Rudolphinae (Rudolphine Tables) (1627)
- Somnium (The Dream) (1634) (English translation on Google Books preview)
- [Opere] (in Latin). Vol. 1. Frankfurt am Main: Heyder & Zimmer. 1858.
  - [Opere] (in Latin). Vol. 2. Frankfurt am Main: Heyder & Zimmer. 1859.
  - [Opere] (in Latin). Vol. 3. Frankfurt am Main: Heyder & Zimmer. 1860.
  - [Opere] (in Latin). Vol. 4. Frankfurt am Main: Heyder & Zimmer. 1863.
  - [Opere] (in Latin). Vol. 5. Frankfurt am Main: Heyder & Zimmer. 1864.
  - [Opere] (in Latin). Vol. 6. Frankfurt am Main: Heyder & Zimmer. 1866.
  - [Opere] (in Latin). Vol. 7. Frankfurt am Main: Heyder & Zimmer. 1868.
  - [Opere] (in Latin). Vol. 8. Frankfurt am Main: Heyder & Zimmer. 1870.
  - [Opere] (in Latin). Vol. 9. Frankfurt am Main: Heyder & Zimmer. 1871.

A critical edition of Kepler's collected works (Johannes Kepler Gesammelte Werke, KGW) in 22 volumes is being edited by the Kepler-Kommission (founded 1935) on behalf of the Bayerische Akademie der Wissenschaften.

Vol. 1: Mysterium Cosmographicum. De Stella Nova. Ed. M. Caspar. 1938, 2nd ed. 1993. Paperback ISBN 3-406-01639-1.
Vol. 2: Astronomiae pars optica. Ed. F. Hammer. 1939, Paperback ISBN 3-406-01641-3.
Vol. 3: Astronomia Nova. Ed. M. Caspar. 1937. IV, 487 p. 2. ed. 1990. Paperback ISBN 3-406-01643-X. Semi-parchment ISBN 3-406-01642-1.
Vol. 4: Kleinere Schriften 1602–1611. Dioptrice. Ed. M. Caspar, F. Hammer. 1941. ISBN 3-406-01644-8.
Vol. 5: Chronologische Schriften. Ed. F. Hammer. 1953. Out-of-print.
Vol. 6: Harmonice Mundi. Ed. M. Caspar. 1940, 2nd ed. 1981, ISBN 3-406-01648-0.
Vol. 7: Epitome Astronomiae Copernicanae. Ed. M. Caspar. 1953, 2nd ed. 1991. ISBN 3-406-01650-2, Paperback ISBN 3-406-01651-0.
Vol. 8: Mysterium Cosmographicum. Editio altera cum notis. De Cometis. Hyperaspistes. Commentary F. Hammer. 1955. Paperback ISBN 3-406-01653-7.
Vol 9: Mathematische Schriften. Ed. F. Hammer. 1955, 2nd ed. 1999. Out-of-print.
Vol. 10: Tabulae Rudolphinae. Ed. F. Hammer. 1969. ISBN 3-406-01656-1.
Vol. 11,1: Ephemerides novae motuum coelestium. Commentary V. Bialas. 1983. ISBN 3-406-01658-8, Paperback ISBN 3-406-01659-6.
Vol. 11,2: Calendaria et Prognostica. Astronomica minora. Somnium. Commentary V. Bialas, H. Grössing. 1993. ISBN 3-406-37510-3, Paperback ISBN 3-406-37511-1.
Vol. 12: Theologica. Hexenprozeß. Tacitus-Übersetzung. Gedichte. Commentary J. Hübner, H. Grössing, F. Boockmann, F. Seck. Directed by V. Bialas. 1990. ISBN 3-406-01660-X, Paperback ISBN 3-406-01661-8.

- Vols. 13–18: Letters:

Vol. 13: Briefe 1590–1599. Ed. M. Caspar. 1945. 432 p. ISBN 3-406-01663-4.
Vol. 14: Briefe 1599–1603. Ed. M. Caspar. 1949. Out-of-print. 2nd ed. in preparation.
Vol 15: Briefe 1604–1607. Ed. M. Caspar. 1951. 2nd ed. 1995. ISBN 3-406-01667-7.
Vol. 16: Briefe 1607–1611. Ed. M. Caspar. 1954. ISBN 3-406-01668-5.
Vol. 17: Briefe 1612–1620. Ed. M. Caspar. 1955. ISBN 3-406-01671-5.
Vol. 18: Briefe 1620–1630. Ed. M. Caspar. 1959. ISBN 3-406-01672-3.

Vol. 19: Dokumente zu Leben und Werk. Commentary M. List. 1975. ISBN 978-3-406-01674-5.
Vols. 20–21: manuscripts

Vol. 20, 1: Manuscripta astronomica (I). Apologia, De motu Terrae, Hipparchus etc. Commentary V. Bialas. 1988. ISBN 3-406-31501-1. Paperback ISBN 3-406-31502-X.
Vol. 20, 2: Manuscripta astronomica (II). Commentaria in Theoriam Martis. Commentary V. Bialas. 1998. Paperback ISBN 3-406-40593-2.
Vol. 21, 1: Manuscripta astronomica (III) et mathematica. De Calendario Gregoriano. In preparation.
Vol. 21, 2: Manuscripta varia. In preparation.

Vol. 22: General index, in preparation.

The Kepler-Kommission also publishes Bibliographia Kepleriana (2nd edition List, 1968), a complete bibliography of editions of Kepler's works, with a supplementary volume to the second edition (ed. Hamel 1998).

== See also ==
- Theoretical physics
- Cavalieri's principle
- History of astronomy
- History of physics
  - Kepler orbit
  - Kepler triangle
- Kepler–Bouwkamp constant
- Penrose tiling
- Radiation pressure

== Sources ==
- Barker, Peter and Bernard R. Goldstein: "Theological Foundations of Kepler's Astronomy". Osiris, Volume 16. Science in Theistic Contexts. University of Chicago Press, 2001, pp. 88–113
- Caspar, Max. Kepler; transl. and ed. by C. Doris Hellman; with a new introduction and references by Owen Gingerich; bibliographic citations by Owen Gingerich and Alain Segonds. New York: Dover, 1993. ISBN 978-0-486-67605-0
- Connor, James A. Kepler's Witch: An Astronomer's Discovery of Cosmic Order Amid Religious War, Political Intrigue, and the Heresy Trial of His Mother. HarperSanFrancisco, 2004. ISBN 978-0-06-052255-1
- De Gandt, Francois. Force and Geometry in Newton's Principia, Translated by Curtis Wilson, Princeton University Press, 1995. ISBN 978-0-691-03367-9
- Dreyer, J. L. E. A History of Astronomy from Thales to Kepler. Dover Publications Inc, 1967. ISBN 0-486-60079-3
- Field, J. V. Kepler's geometrical cosmology. University of Chicago Press, 1988. ISBN 978-0-226-24823-3
- Gilder, Joshua and Anne-Lee Gilder: Heavenly Intrigue: Johannes Kepler, Tycho Brahe, and the Murder Behind One of History's Greatest Scientific Discoveries, Doubleday (2004). ISBN 978-0-385-50844-5 Reviews bookpage.com,
- Gingerich, Owen. The Eye of Heaven: Ptolemy, Copernicus, Kepler. American Institute of Physics, 1993. ISBN 978-0-88318-863-7 (Masters of modern physics; v. 7)
- Gingerich, Owen: "Kepler, Johannes" in Dictionary of Scientific Biography, Volume VII. Charles Coulston Gillispie, editor. New York: Charles Scribner's Sons, 1973
- Jardine, Nick: "Koyré's Kepler/Kepler's Koyré," History of Science, Vol. 38 (2000), pp. 363–376
- Kepler, Johannes. Johannes Kepler New Astronomy trans. W. Donahue, foreword by O. Gingerich, Cambridge University Press 1993. ISBN 0-521-30131-9
- Kepler, Johannes and Christian Frisch. Joannis Kepleri Astronomi Opera Omnia (John Kepler, Astronomer; Complete Works), 8 volumes (1858–1871). vol. 1, 1858, vol. 2, 1859, vol. 3, 1860, vol. 6, 1866, vol. 7, 1868, Frankfurt am Main and Erlangen, Heyder & Zimmer, – Google Books
- Kepler, Johannes, et al. Great Books of the Western World. Volume 16: Ptolemy, Copernicus, Kepler, Chicago: Encyclopædia Britannica, Inc., 1952. (contains English translations by of Kepler's Epitome, Books IV & V and Harmonice Book 5)
- Koestler, Arthur. The Sleepwalkers: A History of Man's Changing Vision of the Universe. (1959). ISBN 978-0-14-019246-9
- Koyré, Alexandre: Galilean Studies Harvester Press, 1977. ISBN 978-0-85527-354-5
- Koyré, Alexandre: The Astronomical Revolution: Copernicus-Kepler-Borelli Ithaca, NY: Cornell University Press, 1973. ISBN 978-0-8014-0504-4; Methuen, 1973. ISBN 978-0-416-76980-7; Hermann, 1973. ISBN 978-2-7056-5648-5
- Kuhn, Thomas S. The Copernican Revolution: Planetary Astronomy in the Development of Western Thought. Cambridge, MA: Harvard University Press, 1957. ISBN 978-0-674-17103-9
- Lindberg, David C.: "The Genesis of Kepler's Theory of Light: Light Metaphysics from Plotinus to Kepler." Osiris, N.S. 2. University of Chicago Press, 1986, pp. 5–42.
- Lear, John. Kepler's Dream. Berkeley: University of California Press, 1965
- North, John. The Fontana History of Astronomy and Cosmology, Fontana Press, 1994. ISBN 978-0-00-686177-5
- Pannekoek, Anton: A History of Astronomy, Dover Publications Inc 1989. ISBN 978-0-486-65994-7
- Pauli, Wolfgang. Wolfgang Pauli – Writings on physics and philosophy, translated by Robert Schlapp and edited by P. Enz and Karl von Meyenn (Springer Verlag, Berlin, 1994). See section 21, The influence of archetypical ideas on the scientific theories of Kepler, concerning Johannes Kepler and Robert Fludd (1574–1637). ISBN 978-3-540-56859-9
- Schneer, Cecil: "Kepler's New Year's Gift of a Snowflake." Isis, Volume 51, No. 4. University of Chicago Press, 1960, pp. 531–545.
- Shapin, Steven. The Scientific Revolution. Chicago: University of Chicago Press, 1996. ISBN 978-0-226-75020-0
- Stephenson, Bruce. Kepler's physical astronomy. New York: Springer, 1987. ISBN 978-0-387-96541-3 (Studies in the history of mathematics and physical sciences; 13); reprinted Princeton:Princeton Univ. Pr., 1994. ISBN 978-0-691-03652-6
- Stephenson, Bruce. The Music of the Heavens: Kepler's Harmonic Astronomy, Princeton University Press, 1994. ISBN 978-0-691-03439-3
- Toulmin, Stephen and June Goodfield. The Fabric of the Heavens: The Development of Astronomy and Dynamics. Pelican, 1963.
- Westfall, Richard S. The Construction of Modern Science: Mechanism and Mechanics. John Wiley and Sons, 1971. ISBN 0-471-93531-X; reprinted Cambridge University Press, 1978. ISBN 0-521-29295-6
- Westfall, Richard S. Never at Rest: A Biography of Isaac Newton. Cambridge University Press, 1981. ISBN 978-0-521-23143-5
- Wolf, A. A History of Science, Technology and Philosophy in the 16th and 17th centuries. George Allen & Unwin, 1950.
